

513001–513100 

|-bgcolor=#d6d6d6
| 513001 ||  || — || November 18, 2001 || Kitt Peak || Spacewatch ||  || align=right | 2.2 km || 
|-id=002 bgcolor=#E9E9E9
| 513002 ||  || — || March 14, 2007 || Mount Lemmon || Mount Lemmon Survey ||  || align=right | 1.2 km || 
|-id=003 bgcolor=#fefefe
| 513003 ||  || — || October 12, 1998 || Kitt Peak || Spacewatch ||  || align=right data-sort-value="0.60" | 600 m || 
|-id=004 bgcolor=#E9E9E9
| 513004 ||  || — || December 18, 2009 || Mount Lemmon || Mount Lemmon Survey ||  || align=right | 1.1 km || 
|-id=005 bgcolor=#E9E9E9
| 513005 ||  || — || October 14, 2009 || Mount Lemmon || Mount Lemmon Survey ||  || align=right | 1.0 km || 
|-id=006 bgcolor=#fefefe
| 513006 ||  || — || September 29, 2010 || Mount Lemmon || Mount Lemmon Survey ||  || align=right data-sort-value="0.59" | 590 m || 
|-id=007 bgcolor=#E9E9E9
| 513007 ||  || — || May 8, 2008 || Kitt Peak || Spacewatch ||  || align=right data-sort-value="0.70" | 700 m || 
|-id=008 bgcolor=#fefefe
| 513008 ||  || — || December 13, 2010 || Mount Lemmon || Mount Lemmon Survey ||  || align=right data-sort-value="0.93" | 930 m || 
|-id=009 bgcolor=#d6d6d6
| 513009 ||  || — || February 26, 2014 || Haleakala || Pan-STARRS ||  || align=right | 2.2 km || 
|-id=010 bgcolor=#E9E9E9
| 513010 ||  || — || September 27, 2008 || Mount Lemmon || Mount Lemmon Survey ||  || align=right | 1.7 km || 
|-id=011 bgcolor=#fefefe
| 513011 ||  || — || January 14, 2011 || Mount Lemmon || Mount Lemmon Survey ||  || align=right data-sort-value="0.86" | 860 m || 
|-id=012 bgcolor=#E9E9E9
| 513012 ||  || — || November 2, 2008 || Mount Lemmon || Mount Lemmon Survey ||  || align=right | 2.4 km || 
|-id=013 bgcolor=#d6d6d6
| 513013 ||  || — || January 31, 2009 || Mount Lemmon || Mount Lemmon Survey ||  || align=right | 2.9 km || 
|-id=014 bgcolor=#fefefe
| 513014 ||  || — || April 1, 2011 || Mount Lemmon || Mount Lemmon Survey ||  || align=right data-sort-value="0.78" | 780 m || 
|-id=015 bgcolor=#d6d6d6
| 513015 ||  || — || May 21, 2015 || Haleakala || Pan-STARRS ||  || align=right | 2.5 km || 
|-id=016 bgcolor=#E9E9E9
| 513016 ||  || — || February 9, 2010 || Catalina || CSS ||  || align=right | 1.4 km || 
|-id=017 bgcolor=#E9E9E9
| 513017 ||  || — || March 25, 2006 || Kitt Peak || Spacewatch ||  || align=right | 1.6 km || 
|-id=018 bgcolor=#d6d6d6
| 513018 ||  || — || January 14, 2002 || Kitt Peak || Spacewatch ||  || align=right | 2.7 km || 
|-id=019 bgcolor=#d6d6d6
| 513019 ||  || — || October 9, 2004 || Kitt Peak || Spacewatch || 7:4 || align=right | 4.8 km || 
|-id=020 bgcolor=#fefefe
| 513020 ||  || — || November 17, 2007 || Kitt Peak || Spacewatch ||  || align=right | 1.0 km || 
|-id=021 bgcolor=#d6d6d6
| 513021 ||  || — || August 12, 2007 || Siding Spring || SSS ||  || align=right | 2.5 km || 
|-id=022 bgcolor=#FA8072
| 513022 ||  || — || March 19, 2013 || Haleakala || Pan-STARRS ||  || align=right data-sort-value="0.63" | 630 m || 
|-id=023 bgcolor=#E9E9E9
| 513023 ||  || — || November 9, 2013 || Haleakala || Pan-STARRS ||  || align=right | 1.6 km || 
|-id=024 bgcolor=#E9E9E9
| 513024 ||  || — || March 26, 2010 || WISE || WISE ||  || align=right | 1.0 km || 
|-id=025 bgcolor=#d6d6d6
| 513025 ||  || — || November 10, 2006 || Kitt Peak || Spacewatch ||  || align=right | 4.9 km || 
|-id=026 bgcolor=#d6d6d6
| 513026 ||  || — || April 16, 2010 || WISE || WISE ||  || align=right | 4.4 km || 
|-id=027 bgcolor=#d6d6d6
| 513027 ||  || — || August 21, 2006 || Kitt Peak || Spacewatch ||  || align=right | 2.8 km || 
|-id=028 bgcolor=#d6d6d6
| 513028 ||  || — || November 15, 2006 || Catalina || CSS ||  || align=right | 3.3 km || 
|-id=029 bgcolor=#d6d6d6
| 513029 ||  || — || September 21, 2011 || Catalina || CSS ||  || align=right | 3.4 km || 
|-id=030 bgcolor=#d6d6d6
| 513030 ||  || — || August 29, 2006 || Catalina || CSS ||  || align=right | 3.6 km || 
|-id=031 bgcolor=#d6d6d6
| 513031 ||  || — || January 30, 2008 || Mount Lemmon || Mount Lemmon Survey ||  || align=right | 3.1 km || 
|-id=032 bgcolor=#E9E9E9
| 513032 ||  || — || November 4, 2004 || Kitt Peak || Spacewatch ||  || align=right | 1.9 km || 
|-id=033 bgcolor=#E9E9E9
| 513033 ||  || — || June 27, 2008 || Siding Spring || SSS ||  || align=right | 1.7 km || 
|-id=034 bgcolor=#E9E9E9
| 513034 ||  || — || August 25, 2012 || Kitt Peak || Spacewatch ||  || align=right | 2.5 km || 
|-id=035 bgcolor=#fefefe
| 513035 ||  || — || October 3, 1999 || Socorro || LINEAR ||  || align=right data-sort-value="0.88" | 880 m || 
|-id=036 bgcolor=#d6d6d6
| 513036 ||  || — || August 27, 2006 || Anderson Mesa || LONEOS ||  || align=right | 3.2 km || 
|-id=037 bgcolor=#E9E9E9
| 513037 ||  || — || November 4, 2004 || Kitt Peak || Spacewatch ||  || align=right | 1.5 km || 
|-id=038 bgcolor=#fefefe
| 513038 ||  || — || September 15, 2006 || Kitt Peak || Spacewatch ||  || align=right data-sort-value="0.58" | 580 m || 
|-id=039 bgcolor=#d6d6d6
| 513039 ||  || — || May 7, 2010 || Mount Lemmon || Mount Lemmon Survey ||  || align=right | 3.4 km || 
|-id=040 bgcolor=#d6d6d6
| 513040 ||  || — || November 14, 2012 || Mount Lemmon || Mount Lemmon Survey ||  || align=right | 2.9 km || 
|-id=041 bgcolor=#E9E9E9
| 513041 ||  || — || January 29, 2006 || Kitt Peak || Spacewatch ||  || align=right | 3.7 km || 
|-id=042 bgcolor=#E9E9E9
| 513042 ||  || — || April 2, 2006 || Kitt Peak || Spacewatch ||  || align=right | 2.2 km || 
|-id=043 bgcolor=#fefefe
| 513043 ||  || — || September 29, 2010 || Mount Lemmon || Mount Lemmon Survey ||  || align=right data-sort-value="0.50" | 500 m || 
|-id=044 bgcolor=#d6d6d6
| 513044 ||  || — || September 30, 2006 || Kitt Peak || Spacewatch ||  || align=right | 2.6 km || 
|-id=045 bgcolor=#E9E9E9
| 513045 ||  || — || February 13, 2010 || Kitt Peak || Spacewatch ||  || align=right | 1.8 km || 
|-id=046 bgcolor=#d6d6d6
| 513046 ||  || — || July 4, 2005 || Mount Lemmon || Mount Lemmon Survey ||  || align=right | 2.5 km || 
|-id=047 bgcolor=#d6d6d6
| 513047 ||  || — || October 3, 2006 || Mount Lemmon || Mount Lemmon Survey ||  || align=right | 2.4 km || 
|-id=048 bgcolor=#E9E9E9
| 513048 ||  || — || November 18, 2009 || Mount Lemmon || Mount Lemmon Survey ||  || align=right | 1.5 km || 
|-id=049 bgcolor=#d6d6d6
| 513049 ||  || — || February 1, 2008 || Kitt Peak || Spacewatch ||  || align=right | 2.5 km || 
|-id=050 bgcolor=#d6d6d6
| 513050 ||  || — || June 8, 2011 || Haleakala || Pan-STARRS ||  || align=right | 2.8 km || 
|-id=051 bgcolor=#E9E9E9
| 513051 ||  || — || November 23, 2009 || Mount Lemmon || Mount Lemmon Survey ||  || align=right | 2.1 km || 
|-id=052 bgcolor=#d6d6d6
| 513052 ||  || — || April 13, 2010 || WISE || WISE ||  || align=right | 5.7 km || 
|-id=053 bgcolor=#fefefe
| 513053 ||  || — || December 15, 2006 || Kitt Peak || Spacewatch ||  || align=right data-sort-value="0.73" | 730 m || 
|-id=054 bgcolor=#fefefe
| 513054 ||  || — || November 30, 1999 || Kitt Peak || Spacewatch ||  || align=right data-sort-value="0.75" | 750 m || 
|-id=055 bgcolor=#fefefe
| 513055 ||  || — || November 5, 2007 || Mount Lemmon || Mount Lemmon Survey ||  || align=right data-sort-value="0.98" | 980 m || 
|-id=056 bgcolor=#fefefe
| 513056 ||  || — || May 8, 1994 || Kitt Peak || Spacewatch ||  || align=right | 1.1 km || 
|-id=057 bgcolor=#fefefe
| 513057 ||  || — || September 19, 2009 || Mount Lemmon || Mount Lemmon Survey || H || align=right data-sort-value="0.61" | 610 m || 
|-id=058 bgcolor=#E9E9E9
| 513058 ||  || — || October 7, 2004 || Kitt Peak || Spacewatch ||  || align=right | 1.8 km || 
|-id=059 bgcolor=#E9E9E9
| 513059 ||  || — || December 6, 2005 || Kitt Peak || Spacewatch ||  || align=right data-sort-value="0.77" | 770 m || 
|-id=060 bgcolor=#fefefe
| 513060 ||  || — || December 27, 2006 || Mount Lemmon || Mount Lemmon Survey ||  || align=right data-sort-value="0.88" | 880 m || 
|-id=061 bgcolor=#fefefe
| 513061 ||  || — || February 12, 2004 || Kitt Peak || Spacewatch ||  || align=right data-sort-value="0.72" | 720 m || 
|-id=062 bgcolor=#fefefe
| 513062 ||  || — || January 25, 2009 || Kitt Peak || Spacewatch ||  || align=right data-sort-value="0.57" | 570 m || 
|-id=063 bgcolor=#E9E9E9
| 513063 ||  || — || September 18, 2003 || Kitt Peak || Spacewatch ||  || align=right | 2.6 km || 
|-id=064 bgcolor=#E9E9E9
| 513064 ||  || — || March 24, 2006 || Mount Lemmon || Mount Lemmon Survey ||  || align=right | 1.9 km || 
|-id=065 bgcolor=#fefefe
| 513065 ||  || — || September 2, 2010 || Mount Lemmon || Mount Lemmon Survey ||  || align=right data-sort-value="0.68" | 680 m || 
|-id=066 bgcolor=#d6d6d6
| 513066 ||  || — || November 15, 2006 || Kitt Peak || Spacewatch ||  || align=right | 2.6 km || 
|-id=067 bgcolor=#d6d6d6
| 513067 ||  || — || November 16, 2006 || Kitt Peak || Spacewatch ||  || align=right | 3.0 km || 
|-id=068 bgcolor=#d6d6d6
| 513068 ||  || — || May 10, 2005 || Kitt Peak || Spacewatch ||  || align=right | 2.6 km || 
|-id=069 bgcolor=#d6d6d6
| 513069 ||  || — || October 11, 2006 || Siding Spring || SSS ||  || align=right | 3.9 km || 
|-id=070 bgcolor=#E9E9E9
| 513070 ||  || — || November 2, 2013 || Mount Lemmon || Mount Lemmon Survey ||  || align=right | 1.1 km || 
|-id=071 bgcolor=#E9E9E9
| 513071 ||  || — || December 4, 2013 || Haleakala || Pan-STARRS ||  || align=right | 1.7 km || 
|-id=072 bgcolor=#fefefe
| 513072 ||  || — || January 10, 2011 || Mount Lemmon || Mount Lemmon Survey ||  || align=right | 1.1 km || 
|-id=073 bgcolor=#fefefe
| 513073 ||  || — || September 28, 2009 || Kitt Peak || Spacewatch ||  || align=right data-sort-value="0.68" | 680 m || 
|-id=074 bgcolor=#d6d6d6
| 513074 ||  || — || January 22, 1998 || Kitt Peak || Spacewatch ||  || align=right | 1.8 km || 
|-id=075 bgcolor=#E9E9E9
| 513075 ||  || — || June 21, 2012 || Kitt Peak || Spacewatch ||  || align=right | 1.3 km || 
|-id=076 bgcolor=#fefefe
| 513076 ||  || — || March 29, 2008 || Catalina || CSS ||  || align=right data-sort-value="0.84" | 840 m || 
|-id=077 bgcolor=#E9E9E9
| 513077 ||  || — || March 6, 2011 || Kitt Peak || Spacewatch ||  || align=right | 1.1 km || 
|-id=078 bgcolor=#E9E9E9
| 513078 ||  || — || January 19, 2001 || Kitt Peak || Spacewatch ||  || align=right | 2.0 km || 
|-id=079 bgcolor=#d6d6d6
| 513079 ||  || — || November 20, 2000 || Kitt Peak || Spacewatch ||  || align=right | 3.4 km || 
|-id=080 bgcolor=#FA8072
| 513080 ||  || — || April 28, 2004 || Kitt Peak || Spacewatch ||  || align=right | 1.0 km || 
|-id=081 bgcolor=#d6d6d6
| 513081 ||  || — || March 31, 2014 || Mount Lemmon || Mount Lemmon Survey ||  || align=right | 3.0 km || 
|-id=082 bgcolor=#E9E9E9
| 513082 ||  || — || November 29, 2013 || Mount Lemmon || Mount Lemmon Survey ||  || align=right | 1.9 km || 
|-id=083 bgcolor=#E9E9E9
| 513083 ||  || — || February 27, 2006 || Kitt Peak || Spacewatch ||  || align=right | 2.0 km || 
|-id=084 bgcolor=#E9E9E9
| 513084 ||  || — || October 7, 2008 || Mount Lemmon || Mount Lemmon Survey ||  || align=right | 3.6 km || 
|-id=085 bgcolor=#E9E9E9
| 513085 ||  || — || November 4, 2004 || Catalina || CSS ||  || align=right | 1.7 km || 
|-id=086 bgcolor=#E9E9E9
| 513086 ||  || — || December 14, 2013 || Mount Lemmon || Mount Lemmon Survey ||  || align=right | 1.0 km || 
|-id=087 bgcolor=#fefefe
| 513087 ||  || — || January 30, 2011 || Haleakala || Pan-STARRS ||  || align=right data-sort-value="0.80" | 800 m || 
|-id=088 bgcolor=#fefefe
| 513088 ||  || — || May 9, 2006 || Mount Lemmon || Mount Lemmon Survey ||  || align=right data-sort-value="0.76" | 760 m || 
|-id=089 bgcolor=#E9E9E9
| 513089 ||  || — || November 1, 2008 || Kitt Peak || Spacewatch ||  || align=right | 2.7 km || 
|-id=090 bgcolor=#fefefe
| 513090 ||  || — || October 12, 2013 || Catalina || CSS ||  || align=right data-sort-value="0.91" | 910 m || 
|-id=091 bgcolor=#E9E9E9
| 513091 ||  || — || December 8, 2005 || Kitt Peak || Spacewatch ||  || align=right data-sort-value="0.98" | 980 m || 
|-id=092 bgcolor=#fefefe
| 513092 ||  || — || March 4, 2011 || Kitt Peak || Spacewatch ||  || align=right data-sort-value="0.71" | 710 m || 
|-id=093 bgcolor=#d6d6d6
| 513093 ||  || — || June 16, 2010 || WISE || WISE || 7:4 || align=right | 5.3 km || 
|-id=094 bgcolor=#fefefe
| 513094 ||  || — || December 1, 2000 || Kitt Peak || Spacewatch ||  || align=right data-sort-value="0.90" | 900 m || 
|-id=095 bgcolor=#E9E9E9
| 513095 ||  || — || January 1, 2014 || Haleakala || Pan-STARRS ||  || align=right | 1.3 km || 
|-id=096 bgcolor=#d6d6d6
| 513096 ||  || — || December 12, 2012 || Mount Lemmon || Mount Lemmon Survey ||  || align=right | 3.0 km || 
|-id=097 bgcolor=#d6d6d6
| 513097 ||  || — || February 27, 2014 || Kitt Peak || Spacewatch ||  || align=right | 2.4 km || 
|-id=098 bgcolor=#d6d6d6
| 513098 ||  || — || February 12, 2008 || Mount Lemmon || Mount Lemmon Survey ||  || align=right | 2.7 km || 
|-id=099 bgcolor=#E9E9E9
| 513099 ||  || — || August 8, 2012 || Haleakala || Pan-STARRS ||  || align=right | 2.1 km || 
|-id=100 bgcolor=#d6d6d6
| 513100 ||  || — || May 13, 2009 || Kitt Peak || Spacewatch ||  || align=right | 3.4 km || 
|}

513101–513200 

|-bgcolor=#d6d6d6
| 513101 ||  || — || November 18, 2006 || Socorro || LINEAR ||  || align=right | 4.9 km || 
|-id=102 bgcolor=#fefefe
| 513102 ||  || — || November 27, 2006 || Mount Lemmon || Mount Lemmon Survey ||  || align=right data-sort-value="0.75" | 750 m || 
|-id=103 bgcolor=#fefefe
| 513103 ||  || — || October 29, 2003 || Kitt Peak || Spacewatch ||  || align=right data-sort-value="0.69" | 690 m || 
|-id=104 bgcolor=#fefefe
| 513104 ||  || — || September 2, 2010 || Socorro || LINEAR ||  || align=right data-sort-value="0.66" | 660 m || 
|-id=105 bgcolor=#d6d6d6
| 513105 ||  || — || September 17, 2006 || Catalina || CSS ||  || align=right | 2.6 km || 
|-id=106 bgcolor=#fefefe
| 513106 ||  || — || August 31, 2005 || Kitt Peak || Spacewatch ||  || align=right | 1.1 km || 
|-id=107 bgcolor=#E9E9E9
| 513107 ||  || — || January 8, 2010 || Catalina || CSS ||  || align=right | 1.8 km || 
|-id=108 bgcolor=#E9E9E9
| 513108 ||  || — || January 6, 2005 || Catalina || CSS ||  || align=right | 3.1 km || 
|-id=109 bgcolor=#E9E9E9
| 513109 ||  || — || January 21, 2014 || Haleakala || Pan-STARRS ||  || align=right data-sort-value="0.90" | 900 m || 
|-id=110 bgcolor=#fefefe
| 513110 ||  || — || December 29, 2014 || Haleakala || Pan-STARRS ||  || align=right | 1.2 km || 
|-id=111 bgcolor=#d6d6d6
| 513111 ||  || — || August 24, 2011 || Siding Spring || SSS ||  || align=right | 2.1 km || 
|-id=112 bgcolor=#E9E9E9
| 513112 ||  || — || December 27, 2005 || Kitt Peak || Spacewatch ||  || align=right | 1.0 km || 
|-id=113 bgcolor=#E9E9E9
| 513113 ||  || — || December 26, 2005 || Kitt Peak || Spacewatch ||  || align=right data-sort-value="0.72" | 720 m || 
|-id=114 bgcolor=#d6d6d6
| 513114 ||  || — || November 16, 2006 || Kitt Peak || Spacewatch ||  || align=right | 2.7 km || 
|-id=115 bgcolor=#d6d6d6
| 513115 ||  || — || September 20, 2011 || Kitt Peak || Spacewatch ||  || align=right | 3.0 km || 
|-id=116 bgcolor=#E9E9E9
| 513116 ||  || — || November 11, 2004 || Kitt Peak || Spacewatch ||  || align=right | 1.9 km || 
|-id=117 bgcolor=#fefefe
| 513117 ||  || — || September 11, 2005 || Kitt Peak || Spacewatch ||  || align=right data-sort-value="0.72" | 720 m || 
|-id=118 bgcolor=#E9E9E9
| 513118 ||  || — || January 10, 2010 || Mount Lemmon || Mount Lemmon Survey ||  || align=right | 2.8 km || 
|-id=119 bgcolor=#E9E9E9
| 513119 ||  || — || November 10, 2004 || Kitt Peak || Spacewatch ||  || align=right | 1.6 km || 
|-id=120 bgcolor=#E9E9E9
| 513120 ||  || — || January 28, 2015 || Haleakala || Pan-STARRS ||  || align=right | 1.0 km || 
|-id=121 bgcolor=#E9E9E9
| 513121 ||  || — || September 26, 2000 || Anderson Mesa || LONEOS ||  || align=right | 1.3 km || 
|-id=122 bgcolor=#fefefe
| 513122 ||  || — || September 17, 2006 || Socorro || LINEAR ||  || align=right data-sort-value="0.68" | 680 m || 
|-id=123 bgcolor=#d6d6d6
| 513123 ||  || — || February 10, 1996 || Kitt Peak || Spacewatch ||  || align=right | 2.2 km || 
|-id=124 bgcolor=#E9E9E9
| 513124 ||  || — || May 9, 1996 || Kitt Peak || Spacewatch ||  || align=right | 1.8 km || 
|-id=125 bgcolor=#FFC2E0
| 513125 ||  || — || April 14, 1997 || Socorro || LINEAR || APO || align=right data-sort-value="0.74" | 740 m || 
|-id=126 bgcolor=#FFC2E0
| 513126 ||  || — || August 17, 1998 || Socorro || LINEAR || APOPHA || align=right data-sort-value="0.20" | 200 m || 
|-id=127 bgcolor=#fefefe
| 513127 ||  || — || November 10, 1998 || Caussols || ODAS ||  || align=right | 2.1 km || 
|-id=128 bgcolor=#E9E9E9
| 513128 ||  || — || October 31, 1999 || Kitt Peak || Spacewatch ||  || align=right | 1.5 km || 
|-id=129 bgcolor=#E9E9E9
| 513129 ||  || — || October 9, 1999 || Socorro || LINEAR ||  || align=right | 1.4 km || 
|-id=130 bgcolor=#fefefe
| 513130 ||  || — || January 30, 2000 || Kitt Peak || Spacewatch ||  || align=right data-sort-value="0.74" | 740 m || 
|-id=131 bgcolor=#fefefe
| 513131 ||  || — || September 1, 2000 || Socorro || LINEAR || H || align=right data-sort-value="0.60" | 600 m || 
|-id=132 bgcolor=#FA8072
| 513132 ||  || — || September 2, 2000 || Anderson Mesa || LONEOS ||  || align=right data-sort-value="0.69" | 690 m || 
|-id=133 bgcolor=#d6d6d6
| 513133 ||  || — || August 31, 2000 || Socorro || LINEAR ||  || align=right | 2.7 km || 
|-id=134 bgcolor=#E9E9E9
| 513134 ||  || — || October 1, 2000 || Socorro || LINEAR ||  || align=right | 1.9 km || 
|-id=135 bgcolor=#FA8072
| 513135 ||  || — || January 19, 2001 || Socorro || LINEAR ||  || align=right | 1.3 km || 
|-id=136 bgcolor=#E9E9E9
| 513136 ||  || — || March 19, 2001 || Socorro || LINEAR ||  || align=right | 1.4 km || 
|-id=137 bgcolor=#E9E9E9
| 513137 ||  || — || September 11, 2001 || Socorro || LINEAR ||  || align=right | 2.3 km || 
|-id=138 bgcolor=#FFC2E0
| 513138 ||  || — || February 12, 2002 || Socorro || LINEAR || APO || align=right data-sort-value="0.23" | 230 m || 
|-id=139 bgcolor=#d6d6d6
| 513139 ||  || — || February 8, 2002 || Kitt Peak || Spacewatch ||  || align=right | 1.8 km || 
|-id=140 bgcolor=#d6d6d6
| 513140 ||  || — || February 20, 2002 || Kitt Peak || Spacewatch ||  || align=right | 2.8 km || 
|-id=141 bgcolor=#E9E9E9
| 513141 ||  || — || March 4, 2002 || Socorro || LINEAR ||  || align=right | 2.9 km || 
|-id=142 bgcolor=#E9E9E9
| 513142 ||  || — || August 8, 2002 || Palomar || NEAT ||  || align=right | 1.8 km || 
|-id=143 bgcolor=#E9E9E9
| 513143 ||  || — || September 14, 2002 || Kitt Peak || Spacewatch || HOF || align=right | 2.1 km || 
|-id=144 bgcolor=#E9E9E9
| 513144 ||  || — || October 5, 2002 || Apache Point || SDSS ||  || align=right | 2.1 km || 
|-id=145 bgcolor=#FA8072
| 513145 ||  || — || December 13, 2002 || Socorro || LINEAR ||  || align=right data-sort-value="0.84" | 840 m || 
|-id=146 bgcolor=#fefefe
| 513146 ||  || — || January 31, 2003 || Kitt Peak || Spacewatch ||  || align=right data-sort-value="0.75" | 750 m || 
|-id=147 bgcolor=#FA8072
| 513147 ||  || — || March 8, 2003 || Socorro || LINEAR || H || align=right data-sort-value="0.87" | 870 m || 
|-id=148 bgcolor=#d6d6d6
| 513148 ||  || — || April 7, 2003 || Kvistaberg || UDAS ||  || align=right | 2.2 km || 
|-id=149 bgcolor=#fefefe
| 513149 ||  || — || May 2, 2003 || Kitt Peak || Spacewatch ||  || align=right data-sort-value="0.75" | 750 m || 
|-id=150 bgcolor=#E9E9E9
| 513150 ||  || — || July 25, 2003 || Palomar || NEAT ||  || align=right | 1.2 km || 
|-id=151 bgcolor=#E9E9E9
| 513151 ||  || — || August 22, 2003 || Socorro || LINEAR ||  || align=right | 1.3 km || 
|-id=152 bgcolor=#E9E9E9
| 513152 ||  || — || August 26, 2003 || Socorro || LINEAR ||  || align=right | 1.8 km || 
|-id=153 bgcolor=#FA8072
| 513153 ||  || — || September 16, 2003 || Socorro || LINEAR || H || align=right data-sort-value="0.88" | 880 m || 
|-id=154 bgcolor=#E9E9E9
| 513154 ||  || — || August 25, 2003 || Socorro || LINEAR ||  || align=right | 1.9 km || 
|-id=155 bgcolor=#E9E9E9
| 513155 ||  || — || September 16, 2003 || Kitt Peak || Spacewatch ||  || align=right | 1.4 km || 
|-id=156 bgcolor=#d6d6d6
| 513156 ||  || — || September 18, 2003 || Palomar || NEAT || 7:4* || align=right | 2.6 km || 
|-id=157 bgcolor=#E9E9E9
| 513157 ||  || — || September 26, 2003 || Apache Point || SDSS ||  || align=right | 1.4 km || 
|-id=158 bgcolor=#E9E9E9
| 513158 ||  || — || September 30, 2003 || Socorro || LINEAR ||  || align=right | 1.6 km || 
|-id=159 bgcolor=#E9E9E9
| 513159 ||  || — || October 1, 2003 || Anderson Mesa || LONEOS || JUN || align=right data-sort-value="0.88" | 880 m || 
|-id=160 bgcolor=#E9E9E9
| 513160 ||  || — || September 19, 2003 || Kitt Peak || Spacewatch ||  || align=right | 1.3 km || 
|-id=161 bgcolor=#fefefe
| 513161 ||  || — || November 16, 2003 || Kitt Peak || Spacewatch ||  || align=right data-sort-value="0.55" | 550 m || 
|-id=162 bgcolor=#E9E9E9
| 513162 ||  || — || November 23, 2003 || Socorro || LINEAR ||  || align=right | 1.6 km || 
|-id=163 bgcolor=#FFC2E0
| 513163 ||  || — || December 28, 2003 || Socorro || LINEAR || AMOcritical || align=right data-sort-value="0.27" | 270 m || 
|-id=164 bgcolor=#C2FFFF
| 513164 ||  || — || January 16, 2004 || Kitt Peak || Spacewatch || L5 || align=right | 9.3 km || 
|-id=165 bgcolor=#FFC2E0
| 513165 ||  || — || February 14, 2004 || Catalina || CSS || APO || align=right data-sort-value="0.57" | 570 m || 
|-id=166 bgcolor=#fefefe
| 513166 ||  || — || February 22, 2004 || Kitt Peak || Spacewatch ||  || align=right data-sort-value="0.62" | 620 m || 
|-id=167 bgcolor=#fefefe
| 513167 ||  || — || March 15, 2004 || Catalina || CSS || PHO || align=right data-sort-value="0.82" | 820 m || 
|-id=168 bgcolor=#fefefe
| 513168 ||  || — || February 19, 2004 || Socorro || LINEAR || PHO || align=right data-sort-value="0.99" | 990 m || 
|-id=169 bgcolor=#fefefe
| 513169 ||  || — || March 15, 2004 || Kitt Peak || Spacewatch || NYS || align=right data-sort-value="0.74" | 740 m || 
|-id=170 bgcolor=#FFC2E0
| 513170 ||  || — || May 24, 2004 || Socorro || LINEAR || ATE || align=right data-sort-value="0.32" | 320 m || 
|-id=171 bgcolor=#FFC2E0
| 513171 ||  || — || June 23, 2004 || Socorro || LINEAR || ATEPHAcritical || align=right data-sort-value="0.30" | 300 m || 
|-id=172 bgcolor=#d6d6d6
| 513172 ||  || — || September 8, 2004 || Socorro || LINEAR || 7:4* || align=right | 4.6 km || 
|-id=173 bgcolor=#E9E9E9
| 513173 ||  || — || September 11, 2004 || Socorro || LINEAR ||  || align=right data-sort-value="0.95" | 950 m || 
|-id=174 bgcolor=#d6d6d6
| 513174 ||  || — || September 10, 2004 || Kitt Peak || Spacewatch ||  || align=right | 2.5 km || 
|-id=175 bgcolor=#d6d6d6
| 513175 ||  || — || September 11, 2004 || Socorro || LINEAR ||  || align=right | 3.7 km || 
|-id=176 bgcolor=#d6d6d6
| 513176 ||  || — || October 4, 2004 || Kitt Peak || Spacewatch ||  || align=right | 3.5 km || 
|-id=177 bgcolor=#E9E9E9
| 513177 ||  || — || October 6, 2004 || Kitt Peak || Spacewatch ||  || align=right data-sort-value="0.87" | 870 m || 
|-id=178 bgcolor=#E9E9E9
| 513178 ||  || — || December 2, 2004 || Socorro || LINEAR ||  || align=right data-sort-value="0.92" | 920 m || 
|-id=179 bgcolor=#E9E9E9
| 513179 ||  || — || December 14, 2004 || Catalina || CSS ||  || align=right | 1.3 km || 
|-id=180 bgcolor=#E9E9E9
| 513180 ||  || — || December 15, 2004 || Campo Imperatore || CINEOS ||  || align=right | 2.1 km || 
|-id=181 bgcolor=#FFC2E0
| 513181 ||  || — || January 31, 2005 || Socorro || LINEAR || APO || align=right data-sort-value="0.31" | 310 m || 
|-id=182 bgcolor=#FFC2E0
| 513182 ||  || — || February 9, 2005 || Socorro || LINEAR || AMOcritical || align=right data-sort-value="0.32" | 320 m || 
|-id=183 bgcolor=#E9E9E9
| 513183 ||  || — || February 10, 1996 || Kitt Peak || Spacewatch ||  || align=right | 1.3 km || 
|-id=184 bgcolor=#E9E9E9
| 513184 ||  || — || March 9, 2005 || Kitt Peak || Spacewatch ||  || align=right | 1.4 km || 
|-id=185 bgcolor=#fefefe
| 513185 ||  || — || March 11, 2005 || Kitt Peak || Spacewatch ||  || align=right data-sort-value="0.66" | 660 m || 
|-id=186 bgcolor=#E9E9E9
| 513186 ||  || — || April 2, 2005 || Kitt Peak || Spacewatch ||  || align=right | 1.1 km || 
|-id=187 bgcolor=#fefefe
| 513187 ||  || — || April 4, 2005 || Mount Lemmon || Mount Lemmon Survey ||  || align=right data-sort-value="0.44" | 440 m || 
|-id=188 bgcolor=#fefefe
| 513188 ||  || — || April 4, 2005 || Kitt Peak || Spacewatch ||  || align=right data-sort-value="0.65" | 650 m || 
|-id=189 bgcolor=#E9E9E9
| 513189 ||  || — || April 5, 2005 || Anderson Mesa || LONEOS ||  || align=right | 2.1 km || 
|-id=190 bgcolor=#E9E9E9
| 513190 ||  || — || April 5, 2005 || Palomar || NEAT ||  || align=right | 1.3 km || 
|-id=191 bgcolor=#fefefe
| 513191 ||  || — || April 6, 2005 || Kitt Peak || Spacewatch ||  || align=right data-sort-value="0.56" | 560 m || 
|-id=192 bgcolor=#fefefe
| 513192 ||  || — || April 7, 2005 || Kitt Peak || Spacewatch ||  || align=right data-sort-value="0.54" | 540 m || 
|-id=193 bgcolor=#fefefe
| 513193 ||  || — || May 10, 2005 || Socorro || LINEAR || H || align=right data-sort-value="0.92" | 920 m || 
|-id=194 bgcolor=#d6d6d6
| 513194 ||  || — || July 5, 2005 || Kitt Peak || Spacewatch ||  || align=right | 2.4 km || 
|-id=195 bgcolor=#fefefe
| 513195 ||  || — || June 14, 2005 || Mount Lemmon || Mount Lemmon Survey ||  || align=right data-sort-value="0.70" | 700 m || 
|-id=196 bgcolor=#fefefe
| 513196 ||  || — || August 28, 2005 || Kitt Peak || Spacewatch || H || align=right data-sort-value="0.64" | 640 m || 
|-id=197 bgcolor=#fefefe
| 513197 ||  || — || August 28, 2005 || Kitt Peak || Spacewatch ||  || align=right data-sort-value="0.75" | 750 m || 
|-id=198 bgcolor=#fefefe
| 513198 ||  || — || September 14, 2005 || Apache Point || A. C. Becker ||  || align=right data-sort-value="0.78" | 780 m || 
|-id=199 bgcolor=#d6d6d6
| 513199 ||  || — || September 24, 2005 || Kitt Peak || Spacewatch ||  || align=right | 2.7 km || 
|-id=200 bgcolor=#fefefe
| 513200 ||  || — || September 23, 2005 || Kitt Peak || Spacewatch ||  || align=right data-sort-value="0.71" | 710 m || 
|}

513201–513300 

|-bgcolor=#fefefe
| 513201 ||  || — || September 23, 2005 || Kitt Peak || Spacewatch ||  || align=right data-sort-value="0.83" | 830 m || 
|-id=202 bgcolor=#d6d6d6
| 513202 ||  || — || September 26, 2005 || Kitt Peak || Spacewatch || EOS || align=right | 1.4 km || 
|-id=203 bgcolor=#fefefe
| 513203 ||  || — || September 29, 2005 || Mount Lemmon || Mount Lemmon Survey || NYS || align=right data-sort-value="0.60" | 600 m || 
|-id=204 bgcolor=#fefefe
| 513204 ||  || — || October 1, 2005 || Kitt Peak || Spacewatch ||  || align=right data-sort-value="0.86" | 860 m || 
|-id=205 bgcolor=#d6d6d6
| 513205 ||  || — || September 23, 2005 || Kitt Peak || Spacewatch ||  || align=right | 2.9 km || 
|-id=206 bgcolor=#fefefe
| 513206 ||  || — || October 7, 2005 || Kitt Peak || Spacewatch ||  || align=right data-sort-value="0.62" | 620 m || 
|-id=207 bgcolor=#d6d6d6
| 513207 ||  || — || October 3, 2005 || Kitt Peak || Spacewatch ||  || align=right | 2.2 km || 
|-id=208 bgcolor=#fefefe
| 513208 ||  || — || October 6, 2005 || Kitt Peak || Spacewatch || MAS || align=right data-sort-value="0.65" | 650 m || 
|-id=209 bgcolor=#d6d6d6
| 513209 ||  || — || October 24, 2005 || Kitt Peak || Spacewatch ||  || align=right | 2.1 km || 
|-id=210 bgcolor=#d6d6d6
| 513210 ||  || — || October 7, 2005 || Catalina || CSS || TIR || align=right | 2.9 km || 
|-id=211 bgcolor=#d6d6d6
| 513211 ||  || — || October 23, 2005 || Kitt Peak || Spacewatch || THM || align=right | 1.9 km || 
|-id=212 bgcolor=#fefefe
| 513212 ||  || — || October 22, 2005 || Kitt Peak || Spacewatch ||  || align=right data-sort-value="0.65" | 650 m || 
|-id=213 bgcolor=#d6d6d6
| 513213 ||  || — || October 24, 2005 || Kitt Peak || Spacewatch ||  || align=right | 2.2 km || 
|-id=214 bgcolor=#d6d6d6
| 513214 ||  || — || October 25, 2005 || Kitt Peak || Spacewatch || EOS || align=right | 1.7 km || 
|-id=215 bgcolor=#fefefe
| 513215 ||  || — || October 25, 2005 || Kitt Peak || Spacewatch ||  || align=right data-sort-value="0.69" | 690 m || 
|-id=216 bgcolor=#d6d6d6
| 513216 ||  || — || October 27, 2005 || Kitt Peak || Spacewatch || THM || align=right | 2.1 km || 
|-id=217 bgcolor=#fefefe
| 513217 ||  || — || October 28, 2005 || Mount Lemmon || Mount Lemmon Survey || MAS || align=right data-sort-value="0.62" | 620 m || 
|-id=218 bgcolor=#fefefe
| 513218 ||  || — || October 24, 2005 || Kitt Peak || Spacewatch ||  || align=right data-sort-value="0.75" | 750 m || 
|-id=219 bgcolor=#fefefe
| 513219 ||  || — || October 27, 2005 || Kitt Peak || Spacewatch || NYS || align=right data-sort-value="0.60" | 600 m || 
|-id=220 bgcolor=#d6d6d6
| 513220 ||  || — || October 24, 2005 || Kitt Peak || Spacewatch ||  || align=right | 2.4 km || 
|-id=221 bgcolor=#fefefe
| 513221 ||  || — || October 12, 2005 || Kitt Peak || Spacewatch || MAS || align=right data-sort-value="0.59" | 590 m || 
|-id=222 bgcolor=#d6d6d6
| 513222 ||  || — || October 27, 2005 || Kitt Peak || Spacewatch ||  || align=right | 2.4 km || 
|-id=223 bgcolor=#fefefe
| 513223 ||  || — || October 27, 2005 || Kitt Peak || Spacewatch ||  || align=right data-sort-value="0.75" | 750 m || 
|-id=224 bgcolor=#fefefe
| 513224 ||  || — || October 29, 2005 || Mount Lemmon || Mount Lemmon Survey ||  || align=right data-sort-value="0.57" | 570 m || 
|-id=225 bgcolor=#d6d6d6
| 513225 ||  || — || October 30, 2005 || Mount Lemmon || Mount Lemmon Survey || LIX || align=right | 3.6 km || 
|-id=226 bgcolor=#fefefe
| 513226 ||  || — || October 7, 2005 || Catalina || CSS || NYS || align=right data-sort-value="0.68" | 680 m || 
|-id=227 bgcolor=#d6d6d6
| 513227 ||  || — || October 27, 2005 || Apache Point || A. C. Becker ||  || align=right | 2.2 km || 
|-id=228 bgcolor=#d6d6d6
| 513228 ||  || — || November 1, 2005 || Mount Lemmon || Mount Lemmon Survey ||  || align=right | 2.3 km || 
|-id=229 bgcolor=#d6d6d6
| 513229 ||  || — || November 3, 2005 || Catalina || CSS ||  || align=right | 3.6 km || 
|-id=230 bgcolor=#fefefe
| 513230 ||  || — || October 22, 2005 || Kitt Peak || Spacewatch ||  || align=right data-sort-value="0.76" | 760 m || 
|-id=231 bgcolor=#d6d6d6
| 513231 ||  || — || November 1, 2005 || Mount Lemmon || Mount Lemmon Survey || EOS || align=right | 2.2 km || 
|-id=232 bgcolor=#fefefe
| 513232 ||  || — || November 3, 2005 || Kitt Peak || Spacewatch ||  || align=right data-sort-value="0.52" | 520 m || 
|-id=233 bgcolor=#FA8072
| 513233 ||  || — || November 22, 2005 || Catalina || CSS ||  || align=right data-sort-value="0.62" | 620 m || 
|-id=234 bgcolor=#fefefe
| 513234 ||  || — || November 25, 2005 || Mount Lemmon || Mount Lemmon Survey ||  || align=right data-sort-value="0.68" | 680 m || 
|-id=235 bgcolor=#d6d6d6
| 513235 ||  || — || November 22, 2005 || Kitt Peak || Spacewatch ||  || align=right | 1.8 km || 
|-id=236 bgcolor=#fefefe
| 513236 ||  || — || November 25, 2005 || Mount Lemmon || Mount Lemmon Survey ||  || align=right data-sort-value="0.64" | 640 m || 
|-id=237 bgcolor=#fefefe
| 513237 ||  || — || November 30, 2005 || Kitt Peak || Spacewatch ||  || align=right data-sort-value="0.56" | 560 m || 
|-id=238 bgcolor=#d6d6d6
| 513238 ||  || — || November 25, 2005 || Catalina || CSS ||  || align=right | 3.3 km || 
|-id=239 bgcolor=#d6d6d6
| 513239 ||  || — || December 2, 2005 || Mount Lemmon || Mount Lemmon Survey ||  || align=right | 2.7 km || 
|-id=240 bgcolor=#d6d6d6
| 513240 ||  || — || December 27, 2005 || Kitt Peak || Spacewatch ||  || align=right | 2.5 km || 
|-id=241 bgcolor=#d6d6d6
| 513241 ||  || — || January 4, 2006 || Kitt Peak || Spacewatch ||  || align=right | 2.2 km || 
|-id=242 bgcolor=#d6d6d6
| 513242 ||  || — || December 29, 2005 || Kitt Peak || Spacewatch ||  || align=right | 2.7 km || 
|-id=243 bgcolor=#fefefe
| 513243 ||  || — || January 4, 2006 || Kitt Peak || Spacewatch ||  || align=right data-sort-value="0.73" | 730 m || 
|-id=244 bgcolor=#d6d6d6
| 513244 ||  || — || January 21, 2006 || Kitt Peak || Spacewatch ||  || align=right | 3.4 km || 
|-id=245 bgcolor=#E9E9E9
| 513245 ||  || — || January 21, 2006 || Mount Lemmon || Mount Lemmon Survey ||  || align=right | 1.0 km || 
|-id=246 bgcolor=#d6d6d6
| 513246 ||  || — || December 30, 2005 || Mount Lemmon || Mount Lemmon Survey ||  || align=right | 2.3 km || 
|-id=247 bgcolor=#E9E9E9
| 513247 ||  || — || February 20, 2006 || Kitt Peak || Spacewatch ||  || align=right | 1.1 km || 
|-id=248 bgcolor=#E9E9E9
| 513248 ||  || — || February 24, 2006 || Kitt Peak || Spacewatch ||  || align=right data-sort-value="0.79" | 790 m || 
|-id=249 bgcolor=#E9E9E9
| 513249 ||  || — || February 24, 2006 || Mount Lemmon || Mount Lemmon Survey ||  || align=right data-sort-value="0.84" | 840 m || 
|-id=250 bgcolor=#E9E9E9
| 513250 ||  || — || February 20, 2006 || Kitt Peak || Spacewatch ||  || align=right data-sort-value="0.94" | 940 m || 
|-id=251 bgcolor=#C2FFFF
| 513251 ||  || — || January 30, 2006 || Kitt Peak || Spacewatch || L5 || align=right | 7.1 km || 
|-id=252 bgcolor=#E9E9E9
| 513252 ||  || — || January 28, 2006 || Kitt Peak || Spacewatch ||  || align=right | 1.3 km || 
|-id=253 bgcolor=#C2FFFF
| 513253 ||  || — || January 25, 2006 || Kitt Peak || Spacewatch || L5 || align=right | 11 km || 
|-id=254 bgcolor=#E9E9E9
| 513254 ||  || — || April 24, 2006 || Mount Lemmon || Mount Lemmon Survey ||  || align=right | 1.3 km || 
|-id=255 bgcolor=#E9E9E9
| 513255 ||  || — || April 24, 2006 || Kitt Peak || Spacewatch ||  || align=right | 1.6 km || 
|-id=256 bgcolor=#E9E9E9
| 513256 ||  || — || April 26, 2006 || Kitt Peak || Spacewatch ||  || align=right | 1.4 km || 
|-id=257 bgcolor=#E9E9E9
| 513257 ||  || — || April 29, 2006 || Kitt Peak || Spacewatch ||  || align=right | 1.3 km || 
|-id=258 bgcolor=#E9E9E9
| 513258 ||  || — || April 19, 2006 || Kitt Peak || Spacewatch ||  || align=right data-sort-value="0.90" | 900 m || 
|-id=259 bgcolor=#E9E9E9
| 513259 ||  || — || August 13, 2006 || Palomar || NEAT || JUN || align=right | 1.2 km || 
|-id=260 bgcolor=#fefefe
| 513260 ||  || — || September 15, 2006 || Kitt Peak || Spacewatch || H || align=right data-sort-value="0.53" | 530 m || 
|-id=261 bgcolor=#fefefe
| 513261 ||  || — || September 14, 2006 || Mauna Kea || J. Masiero ||  || align=right data-sort-value="0.57" | 570 m || 
|-id=262 bgcolor=#fefefe
| 513262 ||  || — || August 29, 2006 || Kitt Peak || Spacewatch ||  || align=right data-sort-value="0.54" | 540 m || 
|-id=263 bgcolor=#d6d6d6
| 513263 ||  || — || September 17, 2006 || Anderson Mesa || LONEOS ||  || align=right | 2.6 km || 
|-id=264 bgcolor=#fefefe
| 513264 ||  || — || September 19, 2006 || Kitt Peak || Spacewatch || V || align=right data-sort-value="0.49" | 490 m || 
|-id=265 bgcolor=#fefefe
| 513265 ||  || — || September 18, 2006 || Catalina || CSS || H || align=right data-sort-value="0.59" | 590 m || 
|-id=266 bgcolor=#d6d6d6
| 513266 ||  || — || September 17, 2006 || Kitt Peak || Spacewatch ||  || align=right | 1.9 km || 
|-id=267 bgcolor=#fefefe
| 513267 ||  || — || September 19, 2006 || Kitt Peak || Spacewatch ||  || align=right data-sort-value="0.90" | 900 m || 
|-id=268 bgcolor=#fefefe
| 513268 ||  || — || September 17, 2006 || Kitt Peak || Spacewatch ||  || align=right data-sort-value="0.57" | 570 m || 
|-id=269 bgcolor=#d6d6d6
| 513269 ||  || — || September 28, 2006 || Kitt Peak || Spacewatch ||  || align=right | 2.5 km || 
|-id=270 bgcolor=#fefefe
| 513270 ||  || — || July 22, 2006 || Mount Lemmon || Mount Lemmon Survey ||  || align=right | 1.2 km || 
|-id=271 bgcolor=#fefefe
| 513271 ||  || — || August 19, 2006 || Kitt Peak || Spacewatch ||  || align=right data-sort-value="0.53" | 530 m || 
|-id=272 bgcolor=#fefefe
| 513272 ||  || — || October 12, 2006 || Kitt Peak || Spacewatch || NYS || align=right data-sort-value="0.47" | 470 m || 
|-id=273 bgcolor=#fefefe
| 513273 ||  || — || September 27, 2006 || Mount Lemmon || Mount Lemmon Survey ||  || align=right data-sort-value="0.47" | 470 m || 
|-id=274 bgcolor=#fefefe
| 513274 ||  || — || October 2, 2006 || Mount Lemmon || Mount Lemmon Survey ||  || align=right data-sort-value="0.56" | 560 m || 
|-id=275 bgcolor=#fefefe
| 513275 ||  || — || October 16, 2006 || Kitt Peak || Spacewatch ||  || align=right data-sort-value="0.54" | 540 m || 
|-id=276 bgcolor=#d6d6d6
| 513276 ||  || — || September 30, 2006 || Mount Lemmon || Mount Lemmon Survey ||  || align=right | 2.0 km || 
|-id=277 bgcolor=#fefefe
| 513277 ||  || — || October 21, 2006 || Kitt Peak || Spacewatch ||  || align=right data-sort-value="0.59" | 590 m || 
|-id=278 bgcolor=#fefefe
| 513278 ||  || — || October 27, 2006 || Mount Lemmon || Mount Lemmon Survey ||  || align=right data-sort-value="0.58" | 580 m || 
|-id=279 bgcolor=#fefefe
| 513279 ||  || — || October 4, 2006 || Mount Lemmon || Mount Lemmon Survey ||  || align=right data-sort-value="0.65" | 650 m || 
|-id=280 bgcolor=#d6d6d6
| 513280 ||  || — || November 11, 2006 || Mount Lemmon || Mount Lemmon Survey ||  || align=right | 2.0 km || 
|-id=281 bgcolor=#d6d6d6
| 513281 ||  || — || October 18, 2006 || Kitt Peak || Spacewatch ||  || align=right | 2.0 km || 
|-id=282 bgcolor=#fefefe
| 513282 ||  || — || November 15, 2006 || Mount Lemmon || Mount Lemmon Survey || H || align=right data-sort-value="0.75" | 750 m || 
|-id=283 bgcolor=#d6d6d6
| 513283 ||  || — || October 23, 2006 || Catalina || CSS ||  || align=right | 2.4 km || 
|-id=284 bgcolor=#d6d6d6
| 513284 ||  || — || November 18, 2006 || Mount Lemmon || Mount Lemmon Survey ||  || align=right | 2.1 km || 
|-id=285 bgcolor=#d6d6d6
| 513285 ||  || — || November 18, 2006 || Mount Lemmon || Mount Lemmon Survey ||  || align=right | 2.6 km || 
|-id=286 bgcolor=#fefefe
| 513286 ||  || — || December 1, 2006 || Socorro || LINEAR || H || align=right data-sort-value="0.91" | 910 m || 
|-id=287 bgcolor=#fefefe
| 513287 ||  || — || December 13, 2006 || Kitt Peak || Spacewatch ||  || align=right data-sort-value="0.62" | 620 m || 
|-id=288 bgcolor=#d6d6d6
| 513288 ||  || — || December 21, 2006 || Mount Lemmon || Mount Lemmon Survey ||  || align=right | 3.1 km || 
|-id=289 bgcolor=#d6d6d6
| 513289 ||  || — || December 13, 2006 || Kitt Peak || Spacewatch ||  || align=right | 2.9 km || 
|-id=290 bgcolor=#fefefe
| 513290 ||  || — || December 13, 2006 || Mount Lemmon || Mount Lemmon Survey ||  || align=right data-sort-value="0.86" | 860 m || 
|-id=291 bgcolor=#d6d6d6
| 513291 ||  || — || December 21, 2006 || Kitt Peak || Spacewatch ||  || align=right | 2.2 km || 
|-id=292 bgcolor=#fefefe
| 513292 ||  || — || November 28, 2006 || Mount Lemmon || Mount Lemmon Survey || ERI || align=right | 1.2 km || 
|-id=293 bgcolor=#fefefe
| 513293 ||  || — || December 24, 2006 || Kitt Peak || Spacewatch ||  || align=right data-sort-value="0.63" | 630 m || 
|-id=294 bgcolor=#d6d6d6
| 513294 ||  || — || January 27, 2007 || Mount Lemmon || Mount Lemmon Survey ||  || align=right | 2.5 km || 
|-id=295 bgcolor=#d6d6d6
| 513295 ||  || — || January 27, 2007 || Mount Lemmon || Mount Lemmon Survey ||  || align=right | 2.4 km || 
|-id=296 bgcolor=#fefefe
| 513296 ||  || — || January 27, 2007 || Mount Lemmon || Mount Lemmon Survey ||  || align=right data-sort-value="0.94" | 940 m || 
|-id=297 bgcolor=#fefefe
| 513297 ||  || — || January 28, 2007 || Mount Lemmon || Mount Lemmon Survey ||  || align=right data-sort-value="0.71" | 710 m || 
|-id=298 bgcolor=#d6d6d6
| 513298 ||  || — || January 26, 2007 || Kitt Peak || Spacewatch ||  || align=right | 3.8 km || 
|-id=299 bgcolor=#d6d6d6
| 513299 ||  || — || January 27, 2007 || Kitt Peak || Spacewatch || EOS || align=right | 1.8 km || 
|-id=300 bgcolor=#d6d6d6
| 513300 ||  || — || February 6, 2007 || Kitt Peak || Spacewatch ||  || align=right | 2.9 km || 
|}

513301–513400 

|-bgcolor=#fefefe
| 513301 ||  || — || February 6, 2007 || Kitt Peak || Spacewatch || NYS || align=right data-sort-value="0.56" | 560 m || 
|-id=302 bgcolor=#fefefe
| 513302 ||  || — || February 6, 2007 || Kitt Peak || Spacewatch || NYS || align=right data-sort-value="0.65" | 650 m || 
|-id=303 bgcolor=#d6d6d6
| 513303 ||  || — || December 24, 2006 || Kitt Peak || Spacewatch || THM || align=right | 1.7 km || 
|-id=304 bgcolor=#d6d6d6
| 513304 ||  || — || February 6, 2007 || Mount Lemmon || Mount Lemmon Survey ||  || align=right | 2.2 km || 
|-id=305 bgcolor=#d6d6d6
| 513305 ||  || — || January 17, 2007 || Kitt Peak || Spacewatch ||  || align=right | 2.5 km || 
|-id=306 bgcolor=#fefefe
| 513306 ||  || — || January 27, 2007 || Mount Lemmon || Mount Lemmon Survey || MAS || align=right data-sort-value="0.62" | 620 m || 
|-id=307 bgcolor=#d6d6d6
| 513307 ||  || — || February 8, 2007 || Kitt Peak || Spacewatch ||  || align=right | 2.3 km || 
|-id=308 bgcolor=#d6d6d6
| 513308 ||  || — || February 9, 2007 || Kitt Peak || Spacewatch ||  || align=right | 2.9 km || 
|-id=309 bgcolor=#d6d6d6
| 513309 ||  || — || February 17, 2007 || Kitt Peak || Spacewatch ||  || align=right | 2.6 km || 
|-id=310 bgcolor=#fefefe
| 513310 ||  || — || December 27, 2006 || Mount Lemmon || Mount Lemmon Survey ||  || align=right data-sort-value="0.77" | 770 m || 
|-id=311 bgcolor=#fefefe
| 513311 ||  || — || February 17, 2007 || Kitt Peak || Spacewatch || NYS || align=right data-sort-value="0.58" | 580 m || 
|-id=312 bgcolor=#FFC2E0
| 513312 ||  || — || February 23, 2007 || Catalina || CSS || APOPHA || align=right data-sort-value="0.14" | 140 m || 
|-id=313 bgcolor=#d6d6d6
| 513313 ||  || — || February 21, 2007 || Mount Lemmon || Mount Lemmon Survey ||  || align=right | 2.9 km || 
|-id=314 bgcolor=#fefefe
| 513314 ||  || — || December 21, 2006 || Mount Lemmon || Mount Lemmon Survey ||  || align=right data-sort-value="0.68" | 680 m || 
|-id=315 bgcolor=#fefefe
| 513315 ||  || — || February 21, 2007 || Kitt Peak || Spacewatch ||  || align=right data-sort-value="0.71" | 710 m || 
|-id=316 bgcolor=#d6d6d6
| 513316 ||  || — || February 21, 2007 || Kitt Peak || Spacewatch || Tj (2.95) || align=right | 3.5 km || 
|-id=317 bgcolor=#d6d6d6
| 513317 ||  || — || February 21, 2007 || Kitt Peak || Spacewatch || Tj (2.98) || align=right | 3.2 km || 
|-id=318 bgcolor=#d6d6d6
| 513318 ||  || — || February 25, 2007 || Kitt Peak || Spacewatch ||  || align=right | 2.6 km || 
|-id=319 bgcolor=#d6d6d6
| 513319 ||  || — || March 9, 2007 || Kitt Peak || Spacewatch ||  || align=right | 2.4 km || 
|-id=320 bgcolor=#fefefe
| 513320 ||  || — || February 13, 2007 || Mount Lemmon || Mount Lemmon Survey ||  || align=right data-sort-value="0.57" | 570 m || 
|-id=321 bgcolor=#d6d6d6
| 513321 ||  || — || February 21, 2007 || Kitt Peak || Spacewatch ||  || align=right | 2.2 km || 
|-id=322 bgcolor=#d6d6d6
| 513322 ||  || — || February 25, 2007 || Mount Lemmon || Mount Lemmon Survey ||  || align=right | 3.4 km || 
|-id=323 bgcolor=#d6d6d6
| 513323 ||  || — || March 9, 2007 || Kitt Peak || Spacewatch ||  || align=right | 3.1 km || 
|-id=324 bgcolor=#fefefe
| 513324 ||  || — || March 12, 2007 || Mount Lemmon || Mount Lemmon Survey || NYS || align=right data-sort-value="0.52" | 520 m || 
|-id=325 bgcolor=#fefefe
| 513325 ||  || — || February 21, 2007 || Kitt Peak || Spacewatch || MAS || align=right data-sort-value="0.62" | 620 m || 
|-id=326 bgcolor=#fefefe
| 513326 ||  || — || February 22, 2007 || Kitt Peak || Spacewatch ||  || align=right data-sort-value="0.76" | 760 m || 
|-id=327 bgcolor=#fefefe
| 513327 ||  || — || February 17, 2007 || Kitt Peak || Spacewatch || MAS || align=right data-sort-value="0.71" | 710 m || 
|-id=328 bgcolor=#d6d6d6
| 513328 ||  || — || February 21, 2007 || Mount Lemmon || Mount Lemmon Survey ||  || align=right | 3.1 km || 
|-id=329 bgcolor=#fefefe
| 513329 ||  || — || March 9, 2007 || Kitt Peak || Spacewatch ||  || align=right data-sort-value="0.86" | 860 m || 
|-id=330 bgcolor=#fefefe
| 513330 ||  || — || March 9, 2007 || Kitt Peak || Spacewatch ||  || align=right data-sort-value="0.75" | 750 m || 
|-id=331 bgcolor=#fefefe
| 513331 ||  || — || March 15, 2007 || Mount Lemmon || Mount Lemmon Survey ||  || align=right data-sort-value="0.68" | 680 m || 
|-id=332 bgcolor=#d6d6d6
| 513332 ||  || — || March 16, 2007 || Socorro || LINEAR ||  || align=right | 3.0 km || 
|-id=333 bgcolor=#d6d6d6
| 513333 ||  || — || March 16, 2007 || Catalina || CSS ||  || align=right | 3.5 km || 
|-id=334 bgcolor=#fefefe
| 513334 ||  || — || April 20, 2007 || Mount Lemmon || Mount Lemmon Survey ||  || align=right data-sort-value="0.75" | 750 m || 
|-id=335 bgcolor=#fefefe
| 513335 ||  || — || April 22, 2007 || Kitt Peak || Spacewatch || MAS || align=right data-sort-value="0.71" | 710 m || 
|-id=336 bgcolor=#fefefe
| 513336 ||  || — || April 23, 2007 || Mount Graham || VATT || MAS || align=right data-sort-value="0.68" | 680 m || 
|-id=337 bgcolor=#d6d6d6
| 513337 ||  || — || May 10, 2007 || Kitt Peak || Spacewatch || TIR || align=right | 2.7 km || 
|-id=338 bgcolor=#fefefe
| 513338 ||  || — || June 16, 2007 || Kitt Peak || Spacewatch ||  || align=right data-sort-value="0.78" | 780 m || 
|-id=339 bgcolor=#E9E9E9
| 513339 ||  || — || August 8, 2007 || Socorro || LINEAR ||  || align=right | 1.3 km || 
|-id=340 bgcolor=#E9E9E9
| 513340 ||  || — || August 13, 2007 || XuYi || PMO NEO ||  || align=right | 1.6 km || 
|-id=341 bgcolor=#E9E9E9
| 513341 ||  || — || August 21, 2007 || Anderson Mesa || LONEOS ||  || align=right | 2.3 km || 
|-id=342 bgcolor=#E9E9E9
| 513342 ||  || — || August 11, 2007 || Socorro || LINEAR ||  || align=right | 2.1 km || 
|-id=343 bgcolor=#FA8072
| 513343 ||  || — || September 8, 2007 || Anderson Mesa || LONEOS ||  || align=right data-sort-value="0.63" | 630 m || 
|-id=344 bgcolor=#E9E9E9
| 513344 ||  || — || September 14, 2007 || Mount Lemmon || Mount Lemmon Survey ||  || align=right | 1.3 km || 
|-id=345 bgcolor=#E9E9E9
| 513345 ||  || — || September 5, 2007 || Anderson Mesa || LONEOS ||  || align=right | 1.7 km || 
|-id=346 bgcolor=#E9E9E9
| 513346 ||  || — || September 13, 2007 || Catalina || CSS ||  || align=right | 1.3 km || 
|-id=347 bgcolor=#E9E9E9
| 513347 ||  || — || October 11, 2007 || Catalina || CSS ||  || align=right | 2.3 km || 
|-id=348 bgcolor=#E9E9E9
| 513348 ||  || — || October 12, 2007 || Mount Lemmon || Mount Lemmon Survey ||  || align=right | 1.8 km || 
|-id=349 bgcolor=#E9E9E9
| 513349 ||  || — || October 20, 2007 || Kitt Peak || Spacewatch ||  || align=right | 1.7 km || 
|-id=350 bgcolor=#fefefe
| 513350 ||  || — || November 5, 2007 || Kitt Peak || Spacewatch ||  || align=right data-sort-value="0.55" | 550 m || 
|-id=351 bgcolor=#E9E9E9
| 513351 ||  || — || November 8, 2007 || Mount Lemmon || Mount Lemmon Survey || AGN || align=right data-sort-value="0.95" | 950 m || 
|-id=352 bgcolor=#d6d6d6
| 513352 ||  || — || September 16, 2006 || Kitt Peak || Spacewatch || 3:2 || align=right | 4.1 km || 
|-id=353 bgcolor=#E9E9E9
| 513353 ||  || — || November 9, 2007 || Mount Lemmon || Mount Lemmon Survey ||  || align=right | 1.9 km || 
|-id=354 bgcolor=#fefefe
| 513354 ||  || — || December 17, 2007 || Mount Lemmon || Mount Lemmon Survey ||  || align=right data-sort-value="0.71" | 710 m || 
|-id=355 bgcolor=#E9E9E9
| 513355 ||  || — || November 6, 2007 || Kitt Peak || Spacewatch ||  || align=right | 2.5 km || 
|-id=356 bgcolor=#fefefe
| 513356 ||  || — || January 11, 2008 || Kitt Peak || Spacewatch || H || align=right data-sort-value="0.43" | 430 m || 
|-id=357 bgcolor=#fefefe
| 513357 ||  || — || January 11, 2008 || Mount Lemmon || Mount Lemmon Survey ||  || align=right data-sort-value="0.51" | 510 m || 
|-id=358 bgcolor=#FFC2E0
| 513358 ||  || — || February 6, 2008 || Catalina || CSS || APO || align=right data-sort-value="0.39" | 390 m || 
|-id=359 bgcolor=#fefefe
| 513359 ||  || — || February 9, 2008 || Kitt Peak || Spacewatch || H || align=right data-sort-value="0.62" | 620 m || 
|-id=360 bgcolor=#d6d6d6
| 513360 ||  || — || January 10, 2008 || Mount Lemmon || Mount Lemmon Survey ||  || align=right | 2.0 km || 
|-id=361 bgcolor=#fefefe
| 513361 ||  || — || February 11, 2008 || Mount Lemmon || Mount Lemmon Survey ||  || align=right | 1.0 km || 
|-id=362 bgcolor=#fefefe
| 513362 ||  || — || February 13, 2008 || Kitt Peak || Spacewatch ||  || align=right data-sort-value="0.54" | 540 m || 
|-id=363 bgcolor=#fefefe
| 513363 ||  || — || January 11, 2008 || Catalina || CSS ||  || align=right | 1.1 km || 
|-id=364 bgcolor=#fefefe
| 513364 ||  || — || February 26, 2008 || Kitt Peak || Spacewatch ||  || align=right data-sort-value="0.63" | 630 m || 
|-id=365 bgcolor=#fefefe
| 513365 ||  || — || February 29, 2008 || Mount Lemmon || Mount Lemmon Survey ||  || align=right data-sort-value="0.60" | 600 m || 
|-id=366 bgcolor=#fefefe
| 513366 ||  || — || February 28, 2008 || Mount Lemmon || Mount Lemmon Survey ||  || align=right data-sort-value="0.90" | 900 m || 
|-id=367 bgcolor=#fefefe
| 513367 ||  || — || February 8, 2008 || Kitt Peak || Spacewatch ||  || align=right data-sort-value="0.45" | 450 m || 
|-id=368 bgcolor=#d6d6d6
| 513368 ||  || — || February 24, 2008 || Kitt Peak || Spacewatch ||  || align=right | 1.8 km || 
|-id=369 bgcolor=#fefefe
| 513369 ||  || — || February 27, 2008 || Catalina || CSS || H || align=right data-sort-value="0.68" | 680 m || 
|-id=370 bgcolor=#d6d6d6
| 513370 ||  || — || March 7, 2008 || Kitt Peak || Spacewatch || KOR || align=right | 1.6 km || 
|-id=371 bgcolor=#d6d6d6
| 513371 ||  || — || March 8, 2008 || Kitt Peak || Spacewatch ||  || align=right | 1.9 km || 
|-id=372 bgcolor=#d6d6d6
| 513372 ||  || — || February 13, 2008 || Mount Lemmon || Mount Lemmon Survey ||  || align=right | 2.2 km || 
|-id=373 bgcolor=#fefefe
| 513373 ||  || — || March 1, 2008 || Kitt Peak || Spacewatch ||  || align=right data-sort-value="0.54" | 540 m || 
|-id=374 bgcolor=#d6d6d6
| 513374 ||  || — || March 11, 2008 || Kitt Peak || Spacewatch || EOS || align=right | 1.5 km || 
|-id=375 bgcolor=#d6d6d6
| 513375 ||  || — || March 5, 2008 || Kitt Peak || Spacewatch ||  || align=right | 1.8 km || 
|-id=376 bgcolor=#d6d6d6
| 513376 ||  || — || March 15, 2008 || Mount Lemmon || Mount Lemmon Survey ||  || align=right | 2.4 km || 
|-id=377 bgcolor=#d6d6d6
| 513377 ||  || — || March 27, 2008 || Kitt Peak || Spacewatch || NAE || align=right | 1.7 km || 
|-id=378 bgcolor=#d6d6d6
| 513378 ||  || — || March 30, 2008 || Kitt Peak || Spacewatch ||  || align=right | 2.1 km || 
|-id=379 bgcolor=#d6d6d6
| 513379 ||  || — || October 30, 2005 || Kitt Peak || Spacewatch || ARM || align=right | 2.7 km || 
|-id=380 bgcolor=#d6d6d6
| 513380 ||  || — || March 2, 2008 || Kitt Peak || Spacewatch ||  || align=right | 3.0 km || 
|-id=381 bgcolor=#d6d6d6
| 513381 ||  || — || October 7, 2004 || Anderson Mesa || LONEOS ||  || align=right | 3.5 km || 
|-id=382 bgcolor=#d6d6d6
| 513382 ||  || — || April 3, 2008 || Mount Lemmon || Mount Lemmon Survey ||  || align=right | 1.9 km || 
|-id=383 bgcolor=#d6d6d6
| 513383 ||  || — || April 4, 2008 || Mount Lemmon || Mount Lemmon Survey ||  || align=right | 2.8 km || 
|-id=384 bgcolor=#fefefe
| 513384 ||  || — || April 6, 2008 || Kitt Peak || Spacewatch ||  || align=right data-sort-value="0.68" | 680 m || 
|-id=385 bgcolor=#fefefe
| 513385 ||  || — || April 7, 2008 || Kitt Peak || Spacewatch || H || align=right data-sort-value="0.57" | 570 m || 
|-id=386 bgcolor=#d6d6d6
| 513386 ||  || — || April 11, 2008 || Kitt Peak || Spacewatch ||  || align=right | 2.2 km || 
|-id=387 bgcolor=#C2FFFF
| 513387 ||  || — || April 4, 2008 || Kitt Peak || Spacewatch || L5 || align=right | 8.2 km || 
|-id=388 bgcolor=#fefefe
| 513388 ||  || — || March 29, 2008 || Mount Lemmon || Mount Lemmon Survey ||  || align=right data-sort-value="0.52" | 520 m || 
|-id=389 bgcolor=#fefefe
| 513389 ||  || — || April 12, 2008 || Mount Lemmon || Mount Lemmon Survey ||  || align=right data-sort-value="0.59" | 590 m || 
|-id=390 bgcolor=#fefefe
| 513390 ||  || — || April 6, 2008 || Mount Lemmon || Mount Lemmon Survey ||  || align=right data-sort-value="0.54" | 540 m || 
|-id=391 bgcolor=#d6d6d6
| 513391 ||  || — || April 11, 2008 || Mount Lemmon || Mount Lemmon Survey ||  || align=right | 2.8 km || 
|-id=392 bgcolor=#d6d6d6
| 513392 ||  || — || April 9, 2008 || Kitt Peak || Spacewatch ||  || align=right | 2.5 km || 
|-id=393 bgcolor=#d6d6d6
| 513393 ||  || — || March 15, 2008 || Mount Lemmon || Mount Lemmon Survey ||  || align=right | 3.4 km || 
|-id=394 bgcolor=#C2FFFF
| 513394 ||  || — || April 16, 2008 || Mount Lemmon || Mount Lemmon Survey || L5 || align=right | 7.5 km || 
|-id=395 bgcolor=#C2FFFF
| 513395 ||  || — || September 24, 2014 || Mount Lemmon || Mount Lemmon Survey || L5 || align=right | 7.4 km || 
|-id=396 bgcolor=#fefefe
| 513396 ||  || — || May 1, 2008 || Kitt Peak || Spacewatch ||  || align=right data-sort-value="0.65" | 650 m || 
|-id=397 bgcolor=#d6d6d6
| 513397 ||  || — || May 7, 2008 || Kitt Peak || Spacewatch ||  || align=right | 3.5 km || 
|-id=398 bgcolor=#C2FFFF
| 513398 ||  || — || May 11, 2008 || Mount Lemmon || Mount Lemmon Survey || L5 || align=right | 7.9 km || 
|-id=399 bgcolor=#d6d6d6
| 513399 ||  || — || May 14, 2008 || Kitt Peak || Spacewatch ||  || align=right | 2.6 km || 
|-id=400 bgcolor=#d6d6d6
| 513400 ||  || — || May 27, 2008 || Kitt Peak || Spacewatch ||  || align=right | 3.1 km || 
|}

513401–513500 

|-bgcolor=#C2FFFF
| 513401 ||  || — || April 15, 2008 || Mount Lemmon || Mount Lemmon Survey || L5 || align=right | 9.5 km || 
|-id=402 bgcolor=#d6d6d6
| 513402 ||  || — || April 13, 2008 || Mount Lemmon || Mount Lemmon Survey ||  || align=right | 3.1 km || 
|-id=403 bgcolor=#C2FFFF
| 513403 ||  || — || April 16, 2008 || Mount Lemmon || Mount Lemmon Survey || L5 || align=right | 11 km || 
|-id=404 bgcolor=#fefefe
| 513404 ||  || — || August 5, 2008 || Siding Spring || SSS ||  || align=right | 1.0 km || 
|-id=405 bgcolor=#fefefe
| 513405 ||  || — || September 3, 2008 || Kitt Peak || Spacewatch ||  || align=right data-sort-value="0.89" | 890 m || 
|-id=406 bgcolor=#E9E9E9
| 513406 ||  || — || September 3, 2008 || Kitt Peak || Spacewatch ||  || align=right data-sort-value="0.83" | 830 m || 
|-id=407 bgcolor=#E9E9E9
| 513407 ||  || — || September 3, 2008 || Kitt Peak || Spacewatch ||  || align=right data-sort-value="0.92" | 920 m || 
|-id=408 bgcolor=#E9E9E9
| 513408 ||  || — || September 21, 2008 || Kitt Peak || Spacewatch ||  || align=right | 1.2 km || 
|-id=409 bgcolor=#E9E9E9
| 513409 ||  || — || September 22, 2008 || Mount Lemmon || Mount Lemmon Survey ||  || align=right data-sort-value="0.75" | 750 m || 
|-id=410 bgcolor=#E9E9E9
| 513410 ||  || — || September 22, 2008 || Kitt Peak || Spacewatch || MAR || align=right data-sort-value="0.76" | 760 m || 
|-id=411 bgcolor=#E9E9E9
| 513411 ||  || — || September 25, 2008 || Kitt Peak || Spacewatch ||  || align=right data-sort-value="0.76" | 760 m || 
|-id=412 bgcolor=#fefefe
| 513412 ||  || — || September 4, 2008 || Kitt Peak || Spacewatch || NYS || align=right data-sort-value="0.61" | 610 m || 
|-id=413 bgcolor=#E9E9E9
| 513413 ||  || — || September 23, 2008 || Kitt Peak || Spacewatch ||  || align=right data-sort-value="0.75" | 750 m || 
|-id=414 bgcolor=#d6d6d6
| 513414 ||  || — || September 23, 2008 || Kitt Peak || Spacewatch || SHU3:2 || align=right | 5.1 km || 
|-id=415 bgcolor=#fefefe
| 513415 ||  || — || September 23, 2008 || Mount Lemmon || Mount Lemmon Survey ||  || align=right data-sort-value="0.68" | 680 m || 
|-id=416 bgcolor=#fefefe
| 513416 ||  || — || September 24, 2008 || Mount Lemmon || Mount Lemmon Survey ||  || align=right data-sort-value="0.97" | 970 m || 
|-id=417 bgcolor=#E9E9E9
| 513417 ||  || — || September 25, 2008 || Kitt Peak || Spacewatch ||  || align=right data-sort-value="0.68" | 680 m || 
|-id=418 bgcolor=#E9E9E9
| 513418 ||  || — || October 2, 2008 || Kitt Peak || Spacewatch ||  || align=right data-sort-value="0.67" | 670 m || 
|-id=419 bgcolor=#E9E9E9
| 513419 ||  || — || September 25, 2008 || Kitt Peak || Spacewatch ||  || align=right data-sort-value="0.87" | 870 m || 
|-id=420 bgcolor=#E9E9E9
| 513420 ||  || — || September 22, 2008 || Mount Lemmon || Mount Lemmon Survey ||  || align=right | 1.1 km || 
|-id=421 bgcolor=#E9E9E9
| 513421 ||  || — || September 29, 2008 || Socorro || LINEAR ||  || align=right | 1.2 km || 
|-id=422 bgcolor=#E9E9E9
| 513422 ||  || — || October 6, 2008 || Mount Lemmon || Mount Lemmon Survey ||  || align=right | 1.5 km || 
|-id=423 bgcolor=#E9E9E9
| 513423 ||  || — || October 20, 2008 || Kitt Peak || Spacewatch ||  || align=right data-sort-value="0.98" | 980 m || 
|-id=424 bgcolor=#E9E9E9
| 513424 ||  || — || October 20, 2008 || Kitt Peak || Spacewatch ||  || align=right | 1.2 km || 
|-id=425 bgcolor=#E9E9E9
| 513425 ||  || — || September 27, 2008 || Mount Lemmon || Mount Lemmon Survey || (1547) || align=right | 1.5 km || 
|-id=426 bgcolor=#fefefe
| 513426 ||  || — || October 21, 2008 || Mount Lemmon || Mount Lemmon Survey || H || align=right data-sort-value="0.49" | 490 m || 
|-id=427 bgcolor=#E9E9E9
| 513427 ||  || — || October 8, 2008 || Mount Lemmon || Mount Lemmon Survey ||  || align=right data-sort-value="0.91" | 910 m || 
|-id=428 bgcolor=#E9E9E9
| 513428 ||  || — || October 23, 2008 || Kitt Peak || Spacewatch ||  || align=right data-sort-value="0.76" | 760 m || 
|-id=429 bgcolor=#E9E9E9
| 513429 ||  || — || September 22, 2008 || Mount Lemmon || Mount Lemmon Survey ||  || align=right | 1.3 km || 
|-id=430 bgcolor=#d6d6d6
| 513430 ||  || — || October 23, 2008 || Kitt Peak || Spacewatch || SHU3:2 || align=right | 4.8 km || 
|-id=431 bgcolor=#E9E9E9
| 513431 ||  || — || October 24, 2008 || Kitt Peak || Spacewatch ||  || align=right data-sort-value="0.87" | 870 m || 
|-id=432 bgcolor=#E9E9E9
| 513432 ||  || — || October 27, 2008 || Mount Lemmon || Mount Lemmon Survey ||  || align=right data-sort-value="0.89" | 890 m || 
|-id=433 bgcolor=#d6d6d6
| 513433 ||  || — || September 22, 2008 || Mount Lemmon || Mount Lemmon Survey || 3:2 || align=right | 3.9 km || 
|-id=434 bgcolor=#E9E9E9
| 513434 ||  || — || October 1, 2008 || Kitt Peak || Spacewatch ||  || align=right | 1.1 km || 
|-id=435 bgcolor=#E9E9E9
| 513435 ||  || — || October 25, 2008 || Kitt Peak || Spacewatch ||  || align=right | 1.1 km || 
|-id=436 bgcolor=#E9E9E9
| 513436 ||  || — || October 30, 2008 || Catalina || CSS || (1547) || align=right | 1.4 km || 
|-id=437 bgcolor=#E9E9E9
| 513437 ||  || — || September 27, 2008 || Mount Lemmon || Mount Lemmon Survey ||  || align=right | 1.0 km || 
|-id=438 bgcolor=#E9E9E9
| 513438 ||  || — || October 31, 2008 || Kitt Peak || Spacewatch ||  || align=right data-sort-value="0.95" | 950 m || 
|-id=439 bgcolor=#d6d6d6
| 513439 ||  || — || October 28, 2008 || Kitt Peak || Spacewatch || 3:2 || align=right | 3.9 km || 
|-id=440 bgcolor=#E9E9E9
| 513440 ||  || — || October 31, 2008 || Catalina || CSS ||  || align=right | 1.1 km || 
|-id=441 bgcolor=#E9E9E9
| 513441 ||  || — || October 1, 2008 || Catalina || CSS ||  || align=right | 1.3 km || 
|-id=442 bgcolor=#E9E9E9
| 513442 ||  || — || October 25, 2008 || Socorro || LINEAR ||  || align=right data-sort-value="0.96" | 960 m || 
|-id=443 bgcolor=#d6d6d6
| 513443 ||  || — || October 2, 2008 || Socorro || LINEAR || 3:2 || align=right | 3.7 km || 
|-id=444 bgcolor=#d6d6d6
| 513444 ||  || — || November 3, 2008 || Kitt Peak || Spacewatch || Tj (2.96) || align=right | 3.1 km || 
|-id=445 bgcolor=#fefefe
| 513445 ||  || — || November 8, 2008 || Mount Lemmon || Mount Lemmon Survey ||  || align=right | 1.1 km || 
|-id=446 bgcolor=#E9E9E9
| 513446 ||  || — || November 2, 2008 || Mount Lemmon || Mount Lemmon Survey ||  || align=right | 1.4 km || 
|-id=447 bgcolor=#E9E9E9
| 513447 ||  || — || November 17, 2008 || La Sagra || OAM Obs. ||  || align=right data-sort-value="0.87" | 870 m || 
|-id=448 bgcolor=#fefefe
| 513448 ||  || — || October 27, 2008 || Mount Lemmon || Mount Lemmon Survey ||  || align=right data-sort-value="0.81" | 810 m || 
|-id=449 bgcolor=#E9E9E9
| 513449 ||  || — || November 24, 2008 || Catalina || CSS ||  || align=right | 1.1 km || 
|-id=450 bgcolor=#E9E9E9
| 513450 ||  || — || November 20, 2008 || Mount Lemmon || Mount Lemmon Survey || MAR || align=right data-sort-value="0.87" | 870 m || 
|-id=451 bgcolor=#E9E9E9
| 513451 ||  || — || December 5, 2008 || Kitt Peak || Spacewatch ||  || align=right | 1.4 km || 
|-id=452 bgcolor=#E9E9E9
| 513452 ||  || — || December 2, 2008 || Kitt Peak || Spacewatch ||  || align=right | 1.7 km || 
|-id=453 bgcolor=#E9E9E9
| 513453 ||  || — || December 30, 2008 || Mount Lemmon || Mount Lemmon Survey ||  || align=right | 1.3 km || 
|-id=454 bgcolor=#E9E9E9
| 513454 ||  || — || December 29, 2008 || Mount Lemmon || Mount Lemmon Survey ||  || align=right | 1.2 km || 
|-id=455 bgcolor=#E9E9E9
| 513455 ||  || — || December 29, 2008 || Kitt Peak || Spacewatch ||  || align=right | 1.5 km || 
|-id=456 bgcolor=#E9E9E9
| 513456 ||  || — || December 22, 2008 || Kitt Peak || Spacewatch ||  || align=right | 1.2 km || 
|-id=457 bgcolor=#E9E9E9
| 513457 ||  || — || December 22, 2008 || Kitt Peak || Spacewatch ||  || align=right | 1.2 km || 
|-id=458 bgcolor=#E9E9E9
| 513458 ||  || — || December 29, 2008 || Mount Lemmon || Mount Lemmon Survey ||  || align=right | 1.9 km || 
|-id=459 bgcolor=#E9E9E9
| 513459 ||  || — || January 2, 2009 || Kitt Peak || Spacewatch ||  || align=right | 1.2 km || 
|-id=460 bgcolor=#E9E9E9
| 513460 ||  || — || December 21, 2008 || Mount Lemmon || Mount Lemmon Survey ||  || align=right | 1.8 km || 
|-id=461 bgcolor=#E9E9E9
| 513461 ||  || — || September 28, 2003 || Kitt Peak || Spacewatch || JUN || align=right data-sort-value="0.97" | 970 m || 
|-id=462 bgcolor=#E9E9E9
| 513462 ||  || — || January 16, 2009 || Kitt Peak || Spacewatch || EUN || align=right | 1.2 km || 
|-id=463 bgcolor=#E9E9E9
| 513463 ||  || — || January 16, 2009 || Kitt Peak || Spacewatch || MRX || align=right data-sort-value="0.86" | 860 m || 
|-id=464 bgcolor=#E9E9E9
| 513464 ||  || — || January 2, 2009 || Mount Lemmon || Mount Lemmon Survey ||  || align=right | 1.1 km || 
|-id=465 bgcolor=#E9E9E9
| 513465 ||  || — || January 20, 2009 || Kitt Peak || Spacewatch ||  || align=right | 1.7 km || 
|-id=466 bgcolor=#E9E9E9
| 513466 ||  || — || November 24, 2008 || Mount Lemmon || Mount Lemmon Survey ||  || align=right | 1.2 km || 
|-id=467 bgcolor=#E9E9E9
| 513467 ||  || — || January 29, 2009 || Mount Lemmon || Mount Lemmon Survey ||  || align=right | 1.9 km || 
|-id=468 bgcolor=#E9E9E9
| 513468 ||  || — || January 30, 2009 || Mount Lemmon || Mount Lemmon Survey || AGN || align=right data-sort-value="0.93" | 930 m || 
|-id=469 bgcolor=#E9E9E9
| 513469 ||  || — || January 17, 2009 || Mount Lemmon || Mount Lemmon Survey || (1547) || align=right | 1.7 km || 
|-id=470 bgcolor=#E9E9E9
| 513470 ||  || — || January 18, 2009 || Kitt Peak || Spacewatch ||  || align=right | 1.3 km || 
|-id=471 bgcolor=#E9E9E9
| 513471 ||  || — || December 20, 2008 || Mount Lemmon || Mount Lemmon Survey ||  || align=right | 1.3 km || 
|-id=472 bgcolor=#FFC2E0
| 513472 ||  || — || February 14, 2009 || Kitt Peak || Spacewatch || APO || align=right data-sort-value="0.47" | 470 m || 
|-id=473 bgcolor=#E9E9E9
| 513473 ||  || — || December 22, 2008 || Kitt Peak || Spacewatch ||  || align=right | 1.1 km || 
|-id=474 bgcolor=#E9E9E9
| 513474 ||  || — || January 1, 2009 || Kitt Peak || Spacewatch ||  || align=right | 1.7 km || 
|-id=475 bgcolor=#E9E9E9
| 513475 ||  || — || February 4, 2009 || Mount Lemmon || Mount Lemmon Survey ||  || align=right | 1.6 km || 
|-id=476 bgcolor=#E9E9E9
| 513476 ||  || — || January 31, 2009 || Kitt Peak || Spacewatch ||  || align=right | 1.4 km || 
|-id=477 bgcolor=#E9E9E9
| 513477 ||  || — || February 22, 2009 || Calar Alto || F. Hormuth ||  || align=right | 1.7 km || 
|-id=478 bgcolor=#E9E9E9
| 513478 ||  || — || February 1, 2009 || Kitt Peak || Spacewatch ||  || align=right | 1.9 km || 
|-id=479 bgcolor=#FA8072
| 513479 ||  || — || January 29, 2009 || Mount Lemmon || Mount Lemmon Survey ||  || align=right | 1.6 km || 
|-id=480 bgcolor=#E9E9E9
| 513480 ||  || — || February 3, 2009 || Mount Lemmon || Mount Lemmon Survey ||  || align=right | 1.6 km || 
|-id=481 bgcolor=#E9E9E9
| 513481 ||  || — || February 22, 2009 || Kitt Peak || Spacewatch ||  || align=right | 1.4 km || 
|-id=482 bgcolor=#E9E9E9
| 513482 ||  || — || February 22, 2009 || Kitt Peak || Spacewatch ||  || align=right | 1.5 km || 
|-id=483 bgcolor=#E9E9E9
| 513483 ||  || — || February 3, 2009 || Kitt Peak || Spacewatch ||  || align=right | 2.5 km || 
|-id=484 bgcolor=#E9E9E9
| 513484 ||  || — || February 22, 2009 || Kitt Peak || Spacewatch ||  || align=right | 2.2 km || 
|-id=485 bgcolor=#E9E9E9
| 513485 ||  || — || February 23, 2009 || La Sagra || OAM Obs. ||  || align=right | 2.0 km || 
|-id=486 bgcolor=#E9E9E9
| 513486 ||  || — || January 1, 2009 || Kitt Peak || Spacewatch ||  || align=right | 1.2 km || 
|-id=487 bgcolor=#E9E9E9
| 513487 ||  || — || January 31, 2009 || Kitt Peak || Spacewatch ||  || align=right | 1.3 km || 
|-id=488 bgcolor=#E9E9E9
| 513488 ||  || — || May 13, 2005 || Mount Lemmon || Mount Lemmon Survey ||  || align=right | 2.3 km || 
|-id=489 bgcolor=#FFC2E0
| 513489 ||  || — || August 3, 2008 || Socorro || LINEAR || APOPHAcritical || align=right data-sort-value="0.36" | 360 m || 
|-id=490 bgcolor=#E9E9E9
| 513490 ||  || — || March 7, 2009 || Mount Lemmon || Mount Lemmon Survey ||  || align=right | 2.4 km || 
|-id=491 bgcolor=#E9E9E9
| 513491 ||  || — || January 27, 2009 || XuYi || PMO NEO ||  || align=right | 1.7 km || 
|-id=492 bgcolor=#FA8072
| 513492 ||  || — || December 31, 2008 || Mount Lemmon || Mount Lemmon Survey ||  || align=right | 1.3 km || 
|-id=493 bgcolor=#E9E9E9
| 513493 ||  || — || February 20, 2009 || Kitt Peak || Spacewatch ||  || align=right | 1.8 km || 
|-id=494 bgcolor=#E9E9E9
| 513494 ||  || — || February 27, 2009 || Catalina || CSS ||  || align=right | 2.7 km || 
|-id=495 bgcolor=#E9E9E9
| 513495 ||  || — || March 16, 2009 || Kitt Peak || Spacewatch ||  || align=right | 2.0 km || 
|-id=496 bgcolor=#E9E9E9
| 513496 ||  || — || April 2, 2009 || Kitt Peak || Spacewatch ||  || align=right | 2.2 km || 
|-id=497 bgcolor=#FFC2E0
| 513497 ||  || — || April 23, 2009 || Siding Spring || SSS || AMO +1km || align=right | 1.0 km || 
|-id=498 bgcolor=#E9E9E9
| 513498 ||  || — || April 27, 2009 || Kitt Peak || Spacewatch ||  || align=right | 1.9 km || 
|-id=499 bgcolor=#d6d6d6
| 513499 ||  || — || February 7, 2008 || Mount Lemmon || Mount Lemmon Survey ||  || align=right | 2.0 km || 
|-id=500 bgcolor=#C2FFFF
| 513500 ||  || — || April 19, 2009 || Kitt Peak || Spacewatch || L5 || align=right | 9.9 km || 
|}

513501–513600 

|-bgcolor=#d6d6d6
| 513501 ||  || — || July 25, 2009 || La Sagra || OAM Obs. ||  || align=right | 2.9 km || 
|-id=502 bgcolor=#d6d6d6
| 513502 ||  || — || July 31, 2009 || Tiki || N. Teamo ||  || align=right | 2.9 km || 
|-id=503 bgcolor=#d6d6d6
| 513503 ||  || — || August 15, 2009 || Kitt Peak || Spacewatch ||  || align=right | 2.6 km || 
|-id=504 bgcolor=#d6d6d6
| 513504 ||  || — || August 16, 2009 || La Sagra || OAM Obs. ||  || align=right | 3.6 km || 
|-id=505 bgcolor=#fefefe
| 513505 ||  || — || August 16, 2009 || La Sagra || OAM Obs. ||  || align=right data-sort-value="0.81" | 810 m || 
|-id=506 bgcolor=#d6d6d6
| 513506 ||  || — || August 19, 2009 || La Sagra || OAM Obs. || AEG || align=right | 2.8 km || 
|-id=507 bgcolor=#d6d6d6
| 513507 ||  || — || July 28, 2009 || Kitt Peak || Spacewatch ||  || align=right | 2.9 km || 
|-id=508 bgcolor=#fefefe
| 513508 ||  || — || August 16, 2009 || Kitt Peak || Spacewatch ||  || align=right data-sort-value="0.52" | 520 m || 
|-id=509 bgcolor=#fefefe
| 513509 ||  || — || September 15, 2009 || Kitt Peak || Spacewatch || MAS || align=right data-sort-value="0.60" | 600 m || 
|-id=510 bgcolor=#fefefe
| 513510 ||  || — || September 15, 2009 || Kitt Peak || Spacewatch ||  || align=right data-sort-value="0.81" | 810 m || 
|-id=511 bgcolor=#d6d6d6
| 513511 ||  || — || September 15, 2009 || Mount Lemmon || Mount Lemmon Survey || VER || align=right | 2.4 km || 
|-id=512 bgcolor=#d6d6d6
| 513512 ||  || — || August 18, 2009 || Kitt Peak || Spacewatch ||  || align=right | 2.5 km || 
|-id=513 bgcolor=#d6d6d6
| 513513 ||  || — || August 18, 2009 || Kitt Peak || Spacewatch ||  || align=right | 3.3 km || 
|-id=514 bgcolor=#fefefe
| 513514 ||  || — || March 10, 2007 || Mount Lemmon || Mount Lemmon Survey ||  || align=right data-sort-value="0.65" | 650 m || 
|-id=515 bgcolor=#fefefe
| 513515 ||  || — || September 19, 2009 || Kitt Peak || Spacewatch ||  || align=right data-sort-value="0.63" | 630 m || 
|-id=516 bgcolor=#fefefe
| 513516 ||  || — || September 18, 2009 || Kitt Peak || Spacewatch ||  || align=right data-sort-value="0.68" | 680 m || 
|-id=517 bgcolor=#fefefe
| 513517 ||  || — || August 15, 2009 || Kitt Peak || Spacewatch || MAS || align=right data-sort-value="0.56" | 560 m || 
|-id=518 bgcolor=#fefefe
| 513518 ||  || — || October 23, 2009 || Mount Lemmon || Mount Lemmon Survey || NYS || align=right data-sort-value="0.52" | 520 m || 
|-id=519 bgcolor=#fefefe
| 513519 ||  || — || October 23, 2009 || Mount Lemmon || Mount Lemmon Survey ||  || align=right data-sort-value="0.82" | 820 m || 
|-id=520 bgcolor=#fefefe
| 513520 ||  || — || October 21, 2009 || Mount Lemmon || Mount Lemmon Survey ||  || align=right data-sort-value="0.9" | 900 m || 
|-id=521 bgcolor=#fefefe
| 513521 ||  || — || October 21, 2009 || Catalina || CSS || H || align=right data-sort-value="0.63" | 630 m || 
|-id=522 bgcolor=#fefefe
| 513522 ||  || — || October 23, 2009 || Mount Lemmon || Mount Lemmon Survey ||  || align=right data-sort-value="0.73" | 730 m || 
|-id=523 bgcolor=#fefefe
| 513523 ||  || — || November 17, 2009 || Mount Lemmon || Mount Lemmon Survey ||  || align=right data-sort-value="0.67" | 670 m || 
|-id=524 bgcolor=#fefefe
| 513524 ||  || — || November 16, 2009 || Kitt Peak || Spacewatch ||  || align=right data-sort-value="0.64" | 640 m || 
|-id=525 bgcolor=#fefefe
| 513525 ||  || — || November 17, 2009 || Kitt Peak || Spacewatch || NYS || align=right data-sort-value="0.63" | 630 m || 
|-id=526 bgcolor=#fefefe
| 513526 ||  || — || October 24, 2005 || Kitt Peak || Spacewatch ||  || align=right data-sort-value="0.53" | 530 m || 
|-id=527 bgcolor=#fefefe
| 513527 ||  || — || October 12, 2009 || Mount Lemmon || Mount Lemmon Survey ||  || align=right data-sort-value="0.71" | 710 m || 
|-id=528 bgcolor=#d6d6d6
| 513528 ||  || — || September 30, 2009 || Mount Lemmon || Mount Lemmon Survey || 3:2 || align=right | 6.7 km || 
|-id=529 bgcolor=#FFC2E0
| 513529 ||  || — || February 9, 2010 || Siding Spring || SSS || APOcritical || align=right data-sort-value="0.71" | 710 m || 
|-id=530 bgcolor=#E9E9E9
| 513530 ||  || — || February 11, 2010 || WISE || WISE ||  || align=right | 1.9 km || 
|-id=531 bgcolor=#fefefe
| 513531 ||  || — || February 6, 2010 || Mount Lemmon || Mount Lemmon Survey || H || align=right data-sort-value="0.57" | 570 m || 
|-id=532 bgcolor=#E9E9E9
| 513532 ||  || — || November 22, 2009 || Mount Lemmon || Mount Lemmon Survey ||  || align=right | 1.9 km || 
|-id=533 bgcolor=#FA8072
| 513533 ||  || — || February 16, 2010 || Kitt Peak || Spacewatch || H || align=right data-sort-value="0.84" | 840 m || 
|-id=534 bgcolor=#fefefe
| 513534 ||  || — || March 10, 2010 || La Sagra || OAM Obs. || H || align=right data-sort-value="0.48" | 480 m || 
|-id=535 bgcolor=#fefefe
| 513535 ||  || — || March 10, 2010 || La Sagra || OAM Obs. || H || align=right data-sort-value="0.65" | 650 m || 
|-id=536 bgcolor=#E9E9E9
| 513536 ||  || — || March 12, 2010 || Kitt Peak || Spacewatch ||  || align=right | 1.5 km || 
|-id=537 bgcolor=#fefefe
| 513537 ||  || — || February 15, 2010 || Catalina || CSS || H || align=right data-sort-value="0.76" | 760 m || 
|-id=538 bgcolor=#E9E9E9
| 513538 ||  || — || March 25, 2010 || Mount Lemmon || Mount Lemmon Survey ||  || align=right data-sort-value="0.75" | 750 m || 
|-id=539 bgcolor=#E9E9E9
| 513539 ||  || — || April 8, 2010 || La Sagra || OAM Obs. ||  || align=right data-sort-value="0.73" | 730 m || 
|-id=540 bgcolor=#E9E9E9
| 513540 ||  || — || October 10, 2008 || Mount Lemmon || Mount Lemmon Survey ||  || align=right | 2.3 km || 
|-id=541 bgcolor=#E9E9E9
| 513541 ||  || — || May 3, 2010 || Kitt Peak || Spacewatch ||  || align=right | 1.3 km || 
|-id=542 bgcolor=#fefefe
| 513542 ||  || — || November 8, 2008 || Mount Lemmon || Mount Lemmon Survey || H || align=right data-sort-value="0.73" | 730 m || 
|-id=543 bgcolor=#E9E9E9
| 513543 ||  || — || November 3, 2007 || Kitt Peak || Spacewatch ||  || align=right | 2.1 km || 
|-id=544 bgcolor=#E9E9E9
| 513544 ||  || — || May 12, 2010 || WISE || WISE ||  || align=right | 1.1 km || 
|-id=545 bgcolor=#E9E9E9
| 513545 ||  || — || February 8, 2010 || WISE || WISE ||  || align=right | 1.8 km || 
|-id=546 bgcolor=#E9E9E9
| 513546 ||  || — || February 24, 2010 || WISE || WISE ||  || align=right | 2.0 km || 
|-id=547 bgcolor=#d6d6d6
| 513547 ||  || — || June 22, 2010 || WISE || WISE ||  || align=right | 4.2 km || 
|-id=548 bgcolor=#d6d6d6
| 513548 ||  || — || March 8, 2008 || Mount Lemmon || Mount Lemmon Survey ||  || align=right | 3.6 km || 
|-id=549 bgcolor=#d6d6d6
| 513549 ||  || — || June 20, 2010 || Mount Lemmon || Mount Lemmon Survey ||  || align=right | 2.9 km || 
|-id=550 bgcolor=#FFC2E0
| 513550 ||  || — || July 8, 2010 || WISE || WISE || AMO +1km || align=right | 1.5 km || 
|-id=551 bgcolor=#d6d6d6
| 513551 ||  || — || July 8, 2010 || WISE || WISE ||  || align=right | 3.3 km || 
|-id=552 bgcolor=#E9E9E9
| 513552 ||  || — || May 24, 2010 || Kitt Peak || Spacewatch || DOR || align=right | 2.5 km || 
|-id=553 bgcolor=#d6d6d6
| 513553 ||  || — || July 12, 2010 || WISE || WISE ||  || align=right | 3.0 km || 
|-id=554 bgcolor=#d6d6d6
| 513554 ||  || — || July 22, 2010 || WISE || WISE ||  || align=right | 3.8 km || 
|-id=555 bgcolor=#d6d6d6
| 513555 ||  || — || July 26, 2010 || WISE || WISE || Tj (2.99) || align=right | 4.1 km || 
|-id=556 bgcolor=#d6d6d6
| 513556 ||  || — || July 27, 2010 || WISE || WISE ||  || align=right | 3.7 km || 
|-id=557 bgcolor=#E9E9E9
| 513557 NIGPAS ||  ||  || August 10, 2010 || XuYi || PMO NEO ||  || align=right | 2.6 km || 
|-id=558 bgcolor=#d6d6d6
| 513558 ||  || — || September 2, 2010 || Mount Lemmon || Mount Lemmon Survey ||  || align=right | 2.8 km || 
|-id=559 bgcolor=#d6d6d6
| 513559 ||  || — || January 28, 2007 || Mount Lemmon || Mount Lemmon Survey ||  || align=right | 3.3 km || 
|-id=560 bgcolor=#d6d6d6
| 513560 ||  || — || September 6, 2010 || Kitt Peak || Spacewatch ||  || align=right | 3.4 km || 
|-id=561 bgcolor=#C2FFFF
| 513561 ||  || — || June 11, 2011 || Mount Lemmon || Mount Lemmon Survey || L5 || align=right | 9.5 km || 
|-id=562 bgcolor=#d6d6d6
| 513562 ||  || — || July 15, 2010 || WISE || WISE ||  || align=right | 2.7 km || 
|-id=563 bgcolor=#d6d6d6
| 513563 ||  || — || September 18, 2010 || Mount Lemmon || Mount Lemmon Survey ||  || align=right | 2.7 km || 
|-id=564 bgcolor=#d6d6d6
| 513564 ||  || — || September 19, 2010 || Kitt Peak || Spacewatch ||  || align=right | 2.5 km || 
|-id=565 bgcolor=#fefefe
| 513565 ||  || — || October 17, 2010 || Mount Lemmon || Mount Lemmon Survey ||  || align=right data-sort-value="0.57" | 570 m || 
|-id=566 bgcolor=#fefefe
| 513566 ||  || — || July 15, 2010 || WISE || WISE ||  || align=right data-sort-value="0.62" | 620 m || 
|-id=567 bgcolor=#d6d6d6
| 513567 ||  || — || April 29, 2008 || Kitt Peak || Spacewatch || EOS || align=right | 1.6 km || 
|-id=568 bgcolor=#d6d6d6
| 513568 ||  || — || October 19, 2010 || Mount Lemmon || Mount Lemmon Survey ||  || align=right | 2.4 km || 
|-id=569 bgcolor=#d6d6d6
| 513569 ||  || — || October 17, 2010 || Mount Lemmon || Mount Lemmon Survey ||  || align=right | 2.6 km || 
|-id=570 bgcolor=#d6d6d6
| 513570 ||  || — || July 13, 2010 || WISE || WISE ||  || align=right | 2.9 km || 
|-id=571 bgcolor=#fefefe
| 513571 ||  || — || May 4, 2005 || Kitt Peak || Spacewatch ||  || align=right data-sort-value="0.75" | 750 m || 
|-id=572 bgcolor=#FFC2E0
| 513572 ||  || — || November 5, 2010 || Socorro || LINEAR || AMOcritical || align=right data-sort-value="0.54" | 540 m || 
|-id=573 bgcolor=#d6d6d6
| 513573 ||  || — || September 3, 2010 || Mount Lemmon || Mount Lemmon Survey ||  || align=right | 3.2 km || 
|-id=574 bgcolor=#d6d6d6
| 513574 ||  || — || November 5, 2010 || Kitt Peak || Spacewatch ||  || align=right | 2.9 km || 
|-id=575 bgcolor=#d6d6d6
| 513575 ||  || — || November 1, 2010 || Kitt Peak || Spacewatch ||  || align=right | 3.2 km || 
|-id=576 bgcolor=#d6d6d6
| 513576 ||  || — || September 18, 2010 || Mount Lemmon || Mount Lemmon Survey ||  || align=right | 2.8 km || 
|-id=577 bgcolor=#d6d6d6
| 513577 ||  || — || September 14, 2010 || Mount Lemmon || Mount Lemmon Survey ||  || align=right | 2.9 km || 
|-id=578 bgcolor=#d6d6d6
| 513578 ||  || — || March 28, 2008 || Kitt Peak || Spacewatch ||  || align=right | 2.8 km || 
|-id=579 bgcolor=#d6d6d6
| 513579 ||  || — || December 8, 2005 || Kitt Peak || Spacewatch ||  || align=right | 3.2 km || 
|-id=580 bgcolor=#fefefe
| 513580 ||  || — || November 8, 2010 || Kitt Peak || Spacewatch ||  || align=right data-sort-value="0.57" | 570 m || 
|-id=581 bgcolor=#fefefe
| 513581 ||  || — || November 27, 2010 || Mount Lemmon || Mount Lemmon Survey ||  || align=right data-sort-value="0.53" | 530 m || 
|-id=582 bgcolor=#d6d6d6
| 513582 ||  || — || December 8, 2010 || Catalina || CSS ||  || align=right | 4.5 km || 
|-id=583 bgcolor=#d6d6d6
| 513583 ||  || — || January 23, 2006 || Kitt Peak || Spacewatch ||  || align=right | 3.4 km || 
|-id=584 bgcolor=#fefefe
| 513584 ||  || — || December 8, 2010 || Mount Lemmon || Mount Lemmon Survey ||  || align=right data-sort-value="0.51" | 510 m || 
|-id=585 bgcolor=#fefefe
| 513585 ||  || — || January 13, 2011 || Kitt Peak || Spacewatch ||  || align=right data-sort-value="0.58" | 580 m || 
|-id=586 bgcolor=#fefefe
| 513586 ||  || — || January 28, 2011 || Mount Lemmon || Mount Lemmon Survey ||  || align=right data-sort-value="0.78" | 780 m || 
|-id=587 bgcolor=#fefefe
| 513587 ||  || — || January 13, 2011 || Kitt Peak || Spacewatch ||  || align=right data-sort-value="0.75" | 750 m || 
|-id=588 bgcolor=#fefefe
| 513588 ||  || — || September 19, 2006 || Kitt Peak || Spacewatch ||  || align=right data-sort-value="0.53" | 530 m || 
|-id=589 bgcolor=#fefefe
| 513589 ||  || — || December 8, 2010 || Mount Lemmon || Mount Lemmon Survey ||  || align=right data-sort-value="0.53" | 530 m || 
|-id=590 bgcolor=#fefefe
| 513590 ||  || — || February 8, 2011 || Mount Lemmon || Mount Lemmon Survey ||  || align=right data-sort-value="0.57" | 570 m || 
|-id=591 bgcolor=#fefefe
| 513591 ||  || — || January 30, 2011 || Haleakala || Pan-STARRS ||  || align=right data-sort-value="0.66" | 660 m || 
|-id=592 bgcolor=#fefefe
| 513592 ||  || — || February 22, 2011 || Kitt Peak || Spacewatch ||  || align=right data-sort-value="0.78" | 780 m || 
|-id=593 bgcolor=#fefefe
| 513593 ||  || — || February 17, 2004 || Socorro || LINEAR ||  || align=right data-sort-value="0.66" | 660 m || 
|-id=594 bgcolor=#fefefe
| 513594 ||  || — || March 19, 2004 || Socorro || LINEAR ||  || align=right data-sort-value="0.85" | 850 m || 
|-id=595 bgcolor=#fefefe
| 513595 ||  || — || February 6, 2011 || La Sagra || OAM Obs. ||  || align=right | 1.0 km || 
|-id=596 bgcolor=#fefefe
| 513596 ||  || — || March 5, 2011 || Kitt Peak || Spacewatch ||  || align=right data-sort-value="0.81" | 810 m || 
|-id=597 bgcolor=#fefefe
| 513597 ||  || — || February 25, 2011 || Kitt Peak || Spacewatch ||  || align=right data-sort-value="0.59" | 590 m || 
|-id=598 bgcolor=#fefefe
| 513598 ||  || — || October 14, 2009 || Mount Lemmon || Mount Lemmon Survey || (2076) || align=right data-sort-value="0.78" | 780 m || 
|-id=599 bgcolor=#fefefe
| 513599 ||  || — || February 21, 2011 || Haleakala || Pan-STARRS ||  || align=right data-sort-value="0.80" | 800 m || 
|-id=600 bgcolor=#fefefe
| 513600 ||  || — || March 13, 2011 || Kitt Peak || Spacewatch || NYS || align=right data-sort-value="0.52" | 520 m || 
|}

513601–513700 

|-bgcolor=#fefefe
| 513601 ||  || — || October 1, 2005 || Mount Lemmon || Mount Lemmon Survey ||  || align=right data-sort-value="0.70" | 700 m || 
|-id=602 bgcolor=#fefefe
| 513602 ||  || — || September 23, 2008 || Mount Lemmon || Mount Lemmon Survey || PHO || align=right data-sort-value="0.95" | 950 m || 
|-id=603 bgcolor=#fefefe
| 513603 ||  || — || January 9, 2007 || Kitt Peak || Spacewatch ||  || align=right data-sort-value="0.73" | 730 m || 
|-id=604 bgcolor=#fefefe
| 513604 ||  || — || December 27, 2006 || Mount Lemmon || Mount Lemmon Survey ||  || align=right data-sort-value="0.71" | 710 m || 
|-id=605 bgcolor=#fefefe
| 513605 ||  || — || February 25, 2011 || Kitt Peak || Spacewatch ||  || align=right data-sort-value="0.59" | 590 m || 
|-id=606 bgcolor=#fefefe
| 513606 ||  || — || April 3, 2011 || Haleakala || Pan-STARRS ||  || align=right data-sort-value="0.66" | 660 m || 
|-id=607 bgcolor=#fefefe
| 513607 ||  || — || February 25, 2011 || Kitt Peak || Spacewatch || MAS || align=right data-sort-value="0.57" | 570 m || 
|-id=608 bgcolor=#fefefe
| 513608 ||  || — || April 6, 2011 || Mount Lemmon || Mount Lemmon Survey || V || align=right data-sort-value="0.54" | 540 m || 
|-id=609 bgcolor=#fefefe
| 513609 ||  || — || April 5, 2000 || Anderson Mesa || LONEOS ||  || align=right data-sort-value="0.76" | 760 m || 
|-id=610 bgcolor=#fefefe
| 513610 ||  || — || May 15, 2004 || Socorro || LINEAR ||  || align=right data-sort-value="0.82" | 820 m || 
|-id=611 bgcolor=#fefefe
| 513611 ||  || — || March 27, 2011 || Mount Lemmon || Mount Lemmon Survey ||  || align=right data-sort-value="0.83" | 830 m || 
|-id=612 bgcolor=#fefefe
| 513612 ||  || — || February 17, 2007 || Kitt Peak || Spacewatch ||  || align=right data-sort-value="0.60" | 600 m || 
|-id=613 bgcolor=#fefefe
| 513613 ||  || — || April 24, 2011 || Haleakala || Pan-STARRS || H || align=right data-sort-value="0.62" | 620 m || 
|-id=614 bgcolor=#fefefe
| 513614 ||  || — || March 13, 2011 || Mount Lemmon || Mount Lemmon Survey ||  || align=right data-sort-value="0.92" | 920 m || 
|-id=615 bgcolor=#FA8072
| 513615 ||  || — || April 30, 2011 || Mount Lemmon || Mount Lemmon Survey || H || align=right data-sort-value="0.61" | 610 m || 
|-id=616 bgcolor=#fefefe
| 513616 ||  || — || September 23, 2008 || Mount Lemmon || Mount Lemmon Survey || NYS || align=right data-sort-value="0.64" | 640 m || 
|-id=617 bgcolor=#fefefe
| 513617 ||  || — || January 27, 2007 || Kitt Peak || Spacewatch || NYS || align=right data-sort-value="0.57" | 570 m || 
|-id=618 bgcolor=#fefefe
| 513618 ||  || — || April 12, 2011 || Kitt Peak || Spacewatch || NYS || align=right data-sort-value="0.65" | 650 m || 
|-id=619 bgcolor=#fefefe
| 513619 ||  || — || September 9, 2008 || Mount Lemmon || Mount Lemmon Survey ||  || align=right data-sort-value="0.82" | 820 m || 
|-id=620 bgcolor=#fefefe
| 513620 ||  || — || February 6, 2007 || Kitt Peak || Spacewatch ||  || align=right data-sort-value="0.71" | 710 m || 
|-id=621 bgcolor=#fefefe
| 513621 ||  || — || April 22, 2007 || Mount Lemmon || Mount Lemmon Survey ||  || align=right data-sort-value="0.75" | 750 m || 
|-id=622 bgcolor=#fefefe
| 513622 ||  || — || April 14, 2011 || Mount Lemmon || Mount Lemmon Survey || V || align=right data-sort-value="0.68" | 680 m || 
|-id=623 bgcolor=#fefefe
| 513623 ||  || — || May 21, 2011 || Haleakala || Pan-STARRS ||  || align=right data-sort-value="0.81" | 810 m || 
|-id=624 bgcolor=#fefefe
| 513624 ||  || — || April 13, 2011 || Haleakala || Pan-STARRS ||  || align=right data-sort-value="0.79" | 790 m || 
|-id=625 bgcolor=#fefefe
| 513625 ||  || — || February 23, 2007 || Kitt Peak || Spacewatch ||  || align=right data-sort-value="0.80" | 800 m || 
|-id=626 bgcolor=#E9E9E9
| 513626 ||  || — || January 30, 2011 || Haleakala || Pan-STARRS ||  || align=right | 1.5 km || 
|-id=627 bgcolor=#E9E9E9
| 513627 ||  || — || May 24, 2011 || Mount Lemmon || Mount Lemmon Survey ||  || align=right | 2.5 km || 
|-id=628 bgcolor=#fefefe
| 513628 ||  || — || March 10, 2007 || Kitt Peak || Spacewatch || MAS || align=right data-sort-value="0.75" | 750 m || 
|-id=629 bgcolor=#E9E9E9
| 513629 ||  || — || July 24, 2011 || Haleakala || Pan-STARRS ||  || align=right | 2.2 km || 
|-id=630 bgcolor=#E9E9E9
| 513630 ||  || — || September 9, 2007 || Kitt Peak || Spacewatch ||  || align=right | 1.5 km || 
|-id=631 bgcolor=#fefefe
| 513631 ||  || — || July 31, 2011 || Haleakala || Pan-STARRS || H || align=right data-sort-value="0.54" | 540 m || 
|-id=632 bgcolor=#E9E9E9
| 513632 ||  || — || February 15, 2010 || Kitt Peak || Spacewatch ||  || align=right | 2.6 km || 
|-id=633 bgcolor=#C2FFFF
| 513633 ||  || — || July 27, 2011 || Haleakala || Pan-STARRS || L5 || align=right | 11 km || 
|-id=634 bgcolor=#C2FFFF
| 513634 ||  || — || July 27, 2011 || Haleakala || Pan-STARRS || L5 || align=right | 8.9 km || 
|-id=635 bgcolor=#E9E9E9
| 513635 ||  || — || August 20, 2011 || Haleakala || Pan-STARRS ||  || align=right data-sort-value="0.90" | 900 m || 
|-id=636 bgcolor=#E9E9E9
| 513636 ||  || — || January 16, 2010 || WISE || WISE ||  || align=right | 1.9 km || 
|-id=637 bgcolor=#FA8072
| 513637 ||  || — || August 29, 2011 || Haleakala || Pan-STARRS || H || align=right data-sort-value="0.45" | 450 m || 
|-id=638 bgcolor=#fefefe
| 513638 ||  || — || August 28, 2011 || Haleakala || Pan-STARRS || H || align=right data-sort-value="0.57" | 570 m || 
|-id=639 bgcolor=#d6d6d6
| 513639 ||  || — || August 20, 2011 || Haleakala || Pan-STARRS || BRA || align=right | 1.2 km || 
|-id=640 bgcolor=#C2FFFF
| 513640 ||  || — || August 20, 2011 || Haleakala || Pan-STARRS || L5 || align=right | 8.8 km || 
|-id=641 bgcolor=#E9E9E9
| 513641 ||  || — || August 23, 2011 || Haleakala || Pan-STARRS ||  || align=right | 1.6 km || 
|-id=642 bgcolor=#fefefe
| 513642 ||  || — || August 30, 2011 || Haleakala || Pan-STARRS || H || align=right data-sort-value="0.65" | 650 m || 
|-id=643 bgcolor=#E9E9E9
| 513643 ||  || — || September 2, 2011 || Haleakala || Pan-STARRS ||  || align=right | 1.8 km || 
|-id=644 bgcolor=#E9E9E9
| 513644 ||  || — || October 9, 2007 || Mount Lemmon || Mount Lemmon Survey ||  || align=right | 1.2 km || 
|-id=645 bgcolor=#d6d6d6
| 513645 ||  || — || September 2, 2011 || Haleakala || Pan-STARRS ||  || align=right | 1.9 km || 
|-id=646 bgcolor=#E9E9E9
| 513646 ||  || — || June 8, 2011 || Haleakala || Pan-STARRS || MRX || align=right | 1.0 km || 
|-id=647 bgcolor=#fefefe
| 513647 ||  || — || September 20, 2011 || Haleakala || Pan-STARRS || H || align=right data-sort-value="0.70" | 700 m || 
|-id=648 bgcolor=#fefefe
| 513648 ||  || — || March 16, 2010 || Mount Lemmon || Mount Lemmon Survey || H || align=right data-sort-value="0.62" | 620 m || 
|-id=649 bgcolor=#E9E9E9
| 513649 ||  || — || July 9, 2011 || Haleakala || Pan-STARRS ||  || align=right | 2.0 km || 
|-id=650 bgcolor=#E9E9E9
| 513650 ||  || — || November 19, 2007 || Kitt Peak || Spacewatch ||  || align=right | 1.9 km || 
|-id=651 bgcolor=#d6d6d6
| 513651 ||  || — || September 2, 2011 || Haleakala || Pan-STARRS ||  || align=right | 2.5 km || 
|-id=652 bgcolor=#fefefe
| 513652 ||  || — || September 22, 2011 || Kitt Peak || Spacewatch || H || align=right data-sort-value="0.76" | 760 m || 
|-id=653 bgcolor=#E9E9E9
| 513653 ||  || — || September 26, 2011 || Mount Lemmon || Mount Lemmon Survey || MAR || align=right | 1.1 km || 
|-id=654 bgcolor=#E9E9E9
| 513654 ||  || — || September 4, 2011 || Haleakala || Pan-STARRS ||  || align=right | 2.1 km || 
|-id=655 bgcolor=#E9E9E9
| 513655 ||  || — || September 26, 2011 || Haleakala || Pan-STARRS || GEF || align=right | 1.2 km || 
|-id=656 bgcolor=#E9E9E9
| 513656 ||  || — || September 8, 2011 || Kitt Peak || Spacewatch || HOF || align=right | 2.0 km || 
|-id=657 bgcolor=#E9E9E9
| 513657 ||  || — || March 3, 2009 || Mount Lemmon || Mount Lemmon Survey || GEF || align=right | 1.1 km || 
|-id=658 bgcolor=#E9E9E9
| 513658 ||  || — || November 3, 2007 || Kitt Peak || Spacewatch ||  || align=right | 1.7 km || 
|-id=659 bgcolor=#fefefe
| 513659 ||  || — || March 16, 2007 || Mount Lemmon || Mount Lemmon Survey || H || align=right data-sort-value="0.65" | 650 m || 
|-id=660 bgcolor=#E9E9E9
| 513660 ||  || — || August 27, 2011 || Haleakala || Pan-STARRS ||  || align=right | 1.8 km || 
|-id=661 bgcolor=#d6d6d6
| 513661 ||  || — || September 25, 2006 || Mount Lemmon || Mount Lemmon Survey || KOR || align=right data-sort-value="0.88" | 880 m || 
|-id=662 bgcolor=#d6d6d6
| 513662 ||  || — || October 20, 2011 || Kitt Peak || Spacewatch ||  || align=right | 3.1 km || 
|-id=663 bgcolor=#d6d6d6
| 513663 ||  || — || October 21, 2006 || Mount Lemmon || Mount Lemmon Survey ||  || align=right | 2.7 km || 
|-id=664 bgcolor=#d6d6d6
| 513664 ||  || — || October 26, 2011 || Haleakala || Pan-STARRS ||  || align=right | 2.4 km || 
|-id=665 bgcolor=#d6d6d6
| 513665 ||  || — || November 22, 2006 || Kitt Peak || Spacewatch ||  || align=right | 2.0 km || 
|-id=666 bgcolor=#d6d6d6
| 513666 ||  || — || October 26, 2011 || Haleakala || Pan-STARRS ||  || align=right | 2.3 km || 
|-id=667 bgcolor=#d6d6d6
| 513667 ||  || — || October 18, 2011 || Haleakala || Pan-STARRS ||  || align=right | 2.4 km || 
|-id=668 bgcolor=#d6d6d6
| 513668 ||  || — || October 16, 2006 || Kitt Peak || Spacewatch || EOS || align=right | 1.3 km || 
|-id=669 bgcolor=#d6d6d6
| 513669 ||  || — || October 20, 2011 || Mount Lemmon || Mount Lemmon Survey ||  || align=right | 2.5 km || 
|-id=670 bgcolor=#E9E9E9
| 513670 ||  || — || September 28, 2011 || Kitt Peak || Spacewatch || AGN || align=right | 1.1 km || 
|-id=671 bgcolor=#d6d6d6
| 513671 ||  || — || September 23, 2011 || Kitt Peak || Spacewatch ||  || align=right | 2.2 km || 
|-id=672 bgcolor=#d6d6d6
| 513672 ||  || — || October 26, 2011 || Haleakala || Pan-STARRS ||  || align=right | 2.4 km || 
|-id=673 bgcolor=#d6d6d6
| 513673 ||  || — || November 25, 2011 || Haleakala || Pan-STARRS ||  || align=right | 2.9 km || 
|-id=674 bgcolor=#d6d6d6
| 513674 ||  || — || October 25, 2011 || Haleakala || Pan-STARRS ||  || align=right | 2.0 km || 
|-id=675 bgcolor=#d6d6d6
| 513675 ||  || — || October 25, 2011 || Haleakala || Pan-STARRS ||  || align=right | 3.7 km || 
|-id=676 bgcolor=#d6d6d6
| 513676 ||  || — || October 25, 2011 || Haleakala || Pan-STARRS ||  || align=right | 2.2 km || 
|-id=677 bgcolor=#d6d6d6
| 513677 ||  || — || November 15, 2006 || Mount Lemmon || Mount Lemmon Survey || KOR || align=right | 1.3 km || 
|-id=678 bgcolor=#d6d6d6
| 513678 ||  || — || January 17, 2007 || Kitt Peak || Spacewatch || THM || align=right | 1.7 km || 
|-id=679 bgcolor=#d6d6d6
| 513679 ||  || — || April 6, 2008 || Mount Lemmon || Mount Lemmon Survey ||  || align=right | 2.6 km || 
|-id=680 bgcolor=#d6d6d6
| 513680 ||  || — || December 2, 2005 || Kitt Peak || Spacewatch ||  || align=right | 3.4 km || 
|-id=681 bgcolor=#d6d6d6
| 513681 ||  || — || December 7, 2005 || Kitt Peak || Spacewatch ||  || align=right | 4.3 km || 
|-id=682 bgcolor=#d6d6d6
| 513682 ||  || — || June 19, 2010 || WISE || WISE ||  || align=right | 2.8 km || 
|-id=683 bgcolor=#d6d6d6
| 513683 ||  || — || May 30, 2010 || WISE || WISE || EUP || align=right | 5.3 km || 
|-id=684 bgcolor=#d6d6d6
| 513684 ||  || — || July 18, 2010 || WISE || WISE ||  || align=right | 2.5 km || 
|-id=685 bgcolor=#d6d6d6
| 513685 ||  || — || January 14, 2012 || Kitt Peak || Spacewatch ||  || align=right | 2.9 km || 
|-id=686 bgcolor=#d6d6d6
| 513686 ||  || — || January 19, 2012 || Kitt Peak || Spacewatch ||  || align=right | 2.4 km || 
|-id=687 bgcolor=#d6d6d6
| 513687 ||  || — || February 4, 2006 || Mount Lemmon || Mount Lemmon Survey ||  || align=right | 3.0 km || 
|-id=688 bgcolor=#d6d6d6
| 513688 ||  || — || January 21, 2012 || Kitt Peak || Spacewatch || 7:4 || align=right | 3.3 km || 
|-id=689 bgcolor=#d6d6d6
| 513689 ||  || — || June 19, 2010 || WISE || WISE ||  || align=right | 3.4 km || 
|-id=690 bgcolor=#d6d6d6
| 513690 ||  || — || December 24, 2005 || Kitt Peak || Spacewatch ||  || align=right | 2.3 km || 
|-id=691 bgcolor=#d6d6d6
| 513691 ||  || — || January 21, 2012 || Catalina || CSS || Tj (2.99) || align=right | 2.8 km || 
|-id=692 bgcolor=#d6d6d6
| 513692 ||  || — || November 2, 2010 || Mount Lemmon || Mount Lemmon Survey ||  || align=right | 3.2 km || 
|-id=693 bgcolor=#d6d6d6
| 513693 ||  || — || December 27, 2011 || Mount Lemmon || Mount Lemmon Survey || LIX || align=right | 2.7 km || 
|-id=694 bgcolor=#d6d6d6
| 513694 ||  || — || January 27, 2012 || Kitt Peak || Spacewatch ||  || align=right | 3.2 km || 
|-id=695 bgcolor=#d6d6d6
| 513695 ||  || — || January 1, 2012 || Mount Lemmon || Mount Lemmon Survey ||  || align=right | 2.7 km || 
|-id=696 bgcolor=#d6d6d6
| 513696 ||  || — || January 19, 2012 || Haleakala || Pan-STARRS ||  || align=right | 3.0 km || 
|-id=697 bgcolor=#d6d6d6
| 513697 ||  || — || January 3, 2012 || Kitt Peak || Spacewatch ||  || align=right | 2.7 km || 
|-id=698 bgcolor=#d6d6d6
| 513698 ||  || — || March 20, 2007 || Catalina || CSS ||  || align=right | 3.2 km || 
|-id=699 bgcolor=#d6d6d6
| 513699 ||  || — || October 7, 2004 || Kitt Peak || Spacewatch ||  || align=right | 2.7 km || 
|-id=700 bgcolor=#d6d6d6
| 513700 ||  || — || February 3, 2012 || Haleakala || Pan-STARRS ||  || align=right | 2.5 km || 
|}

513701–513800 

|-bgcolor=#d6d6d6
| 513701 ||  || — || January 19, 2012 || Kitt Peak || Spacewatch ||  || align=right | 2.5 km || 
|-id=702 bgcolor=#d6d6d6
| 513702 ||  || — || July 27, 2009 || Kitt Peak || Spacewatch ||  || align=right | 3.1 km || 
|-id=703 bgcolor=#d6d6d6
| 513703 ||  || — || January 21, 2012 || Haleakala || Pan-STARRS ||  || align=right | 3.6 km || 
|-id=704 bgcolor=#d6d6d6
| 513704 ||  || — || December 1, 2005 || Kitt Peak || Spacewatch ||  || align=right | 2.9 km || 
|-id=705 bgcolor=#d6d6d6
| 513705 ||  || — || March 14, 2007 || Kitt Peak || Spacewatch ||  || align=right | 3.1 km || 
|-id=706 bgcolor=#d6d6d6
| 513706 ||  || — || January 19, 2012 || Haleakala || Pan-STARRS ||  || align=right | 3.1 km || 
|-id=707 bgcolor=#d6d6d6
| 513707 ||  || — || December 2, 2005 || Kitt Peak || Spacewatch ||  || align=right | 2.5 km || 
|-id=708 bgcolor=#d6d6d6
| 513708 ||  || — || March 16, 2012 || Haleakala || Pan-STARRS || 7:4 || align=right | 3.1 km || 
|-id=709 bgcolor=#fefefe
| 513709 ||  || — || March 28, 2012 || Mount Lemmon || Mount Lemmon Survey ||  || align=right data-sort-value="0.62" | 620 m || 
|-id=710 bgcolor=#fefefe
| 513710 ||  || — || January 30, 2011 || Haleakala || Pan-STARRS ||  || align=right data-sort-value="0.72" | 720 m || 
|-id=711 bgcolor=#FFC2E0
| 513711 ||  || — || August 14, 2012 || Haleakala || Pan-STARRS || AMO || align=right data-sort-value="0.20" | 200 m || 
|-id=712 bgcolor=#d6d6d6
| 513712 ||  || — || May 1, 2011 || Haleakala || Pan-STARRS ||  || align=right | 3.1 km || 
|-id=713 bgcolor=#fefefe
| 513713 ||  || — || September 23, 2008 || Mount Lemmon || Mount Lemmon Survey ||  || align=right | 1.0 km || 
|-id=714 bgcolor=#E9E9E9
| 513714 ||  || — || October 10, 2008 || Mount Lemmon || Mount Lemmon Survey ||  || align=right | 1.0 km || 
|-id=715 bgcolor=#E9E9E9
| 513715 ||  || — || October 24, 2008 || Kitt Peak || Spacewatch ||  || align=right data-sort-value="0.76" | 760 m || 
|-id=716 bgcolor=#fefefe
| 513716 ||  || — || October 10, 2005 || Catalina || CSS ||  || align=right data-sort-value="0.89" | 890 m || 
|-id=717 bgcolor=#fefefe
| 513717 ||  || — || March 3, 1997 || Kitt Peak || Spacewatch ||  || align=right data-sort-value="0.90" | 900 m || 
|-id=718 bgcolor=#fefefe
| 513718 ||  || — || August 10, 2012 || Kitt Peak || Spacewatch ||  || align=right data-sort-value="0.94" | 940 m || 
|-id=719 bgcolor=#d6d6d6
| 513719 ||  || — || October 4, 2006 || Mount Lemmon || Mount Lemmon Survey ||  || align=right | 3.2 km || 
|-id=720 bgcolor=#E9E9E9
| 513720 ||  || — || September 27, 2012 || Haleakala || Pan-STARRS ||  || align=right | 1.6 km || 
|-id=721 bgcolor=#E9E9E9
| 513721 ||  || — || October 6, 2012 || Mount Lemmon || Mount Lemmon Survey ||  || align=right data-sort-value="0.94" | 940 m || 
|-id=722 bgcolor=#fefefe
| 513722 ||  || — || October 8, 2012 || Mount Lemmon || Mount Lemmon Survey ||  || align=right data-sort-value="0.85" | 850 m || 
|-id=723 bgcolor=#fefefe
| 513723 ||  || — || December 18, 2009 || Kitt Peak || Spacewatch ||  || align=right data-sort-value="0.78" | 780 m || 
|-id=724 bgcolor=#E9E9E9
| 513724 ||  || — || October 7, 2012 || Haleakala || Pan-STARRS ||  || align=right data-sort-value="0.98" | 980 m || 
|-id=725 bgcolor=#fefefe
| 513725 ||  || — || September 16, 2012 || Kitt Peak || Spacewatch ||  || align=right data-sort-value="0.78" | 780 m || 
|-id=726 bgcolor=#fefefe
| 513726 ||  || — || May 24, 2011 || Haleakala || Pan-STARRS ||  || align=right data-sort-value="0.86" | 860 m || 
|-id=727 bgcolor=#E9E9E9
| 513727 ||  || — || September 24, 2008 || Mount Lemmon || Mount Lemmon Survey ||  || align=right | 1.1 km || 
|-id=728 bgcolor=#E9E9E9
| 513728 ||  || — || October 9, 2008 || Kitt Peak || Spacewatch || MAR || align=right data-sort-value="0.72" | 720 m || 
|-id=729 bgcolor=#E9E9E9
| 513729 ||  || — || October 9, 2012 || Mount Lemmon || Mount Lemmon Survey ||  || align=right | 1.7 km || 
|-id=730 bgcolor=#E9E9E9
| 513730 ||  || — || October 11, 2012 || Kitt Peak || Spacewatch ||  || align=right | 1.0 km || 
|-id=731 bgcolor=#E9E9E9
| 513731 ||  || — || October 1, 2008 || Catalina || CSS ||  || align=right data-sort-value="0.96" | 960 m || 
|-id=732 bgcolor=#E9E9E9
| 513732 ||  || — || October 8, 2008 || Kitt Peak || Spacewatch ||  || align=right data-sort-value="0.69" | 690 m || 
|-id=733 bgcolor=#E9E9E9
| 513733 ||  || — || October 8, 2012 || Haleakala || Pan-STARRS ||  || align=right data-sort-value="0.79" | 790 m || 
|-id=734 bgcolor=#C2FFFF
| 513734 ||  || — || October 15, 2012 || Haleakala || Pan-STARRS || L5 || align=right | 8.9 km || 
|-id=735 bgcolor=#E9E9E9
| 513735 ||  || — || November 16, 1998 || Kitt Peak || Spacewatch ||  || align=right | 2.4 km || 
|-id=736 bgcolor=#E9E9E9
| 513736 ||  || — || April 20, 2010 || Mount Lemmon || Mount Lemmon Survey ||  || align=right | 1.3 km || 
|-id=737 bgcolor=#E9E9E9
| 513737 ||  || — || October 27, 2008 || Mount Lemmon || Mount Lemmon Survey ||  || align=right data-sort-value="0.67" | 670 m || 
|-id=738 bgcolor=#fefefe
| 513738 ||  || — || September 18, 2012 || Kitt Peak || Spacewatch ||  || align=right data-sort-value="0.86" | 860 m || 
|-id=739 bgcolor=#E9E9E9
| 513739 ||  || — || December 5, 2008 || Mount Lemmon || Mount Lemmon Survey ||  || align=right | 1.2 km || 
|-id=740 bgcolor=#E9E9E9
| 513740 ||  || — || October 13, 2012 || Kitt Peak || Spacewatch ||  || align=right | 1.0 km || 
|-id=741 bgcolor=#E9E9E9
| 513741 ||  || — || October 18, 2012 || Haleakala || Pan-STARRS || ADE || align=right | 1.7 km || 
|-id=742 bgcolor=#E9E9E9
| 513742 ||  || — || September 9, 2008 || Mount Lemmon || Mount Lemmon Survey ||  || align=right data-sort-value="0.85" | 850 m || 
|-id=743 bgcolor=#E9E9E9
| 513743 ||  || — || October 21, 2012 || Haleakala || Pan-STARRS ||  || align=right | 1.5 km || 
|-id=744 bgcolor=#E9E9E9
| 513744 ||  || — || October 21, 2012 || Haleakala || Pan-STARRS ||  || align=right | 1.0 km || 
|-id=745 bgcolor=#E9E9E9
| 513745 ||  || — || December 18, 2004 || Mount Lemmon || Mount Lemmon Survey ||  || align=right | 1.3 km || 
|-id=746 bgcolor=#E9E9E9
| 513746 ||  || — || October 26, 2008 || Kitt Peak || Spacewatch || KON || align=right | 1.9 km || 
|-id=747 bgcolor=#E9E9E9
| 513747 ||  || — || March 20, 2010 || Mount Lemmon || Mount Lemmon Survey ||  || align=right data-sort-value="0.98" | 980 m || 
|-id=748 bgcolor=#E9E9E9
| 513748 ||  || — || October 18, 2012 || Mount Lemmon || Mount Lemmon Survey ||  || align=right | 1.2 km || 
|-id=749 bgcolor=#E9E9E9
| 513749 ||  || — || October 8, 2012 || Kitt Peak || Spacewatch || (5) || align=right data-sort-value="0.83" | 830 m || 
|-id=750 bgcolor=#E9E9E9
| 513750 ||  || — || May 25, 2011 || Mount Lemmon || Mount Lemmon Survey ||  || align=right | 1.6 km || 
|-id=751 bgcolor=#E9E9E9
| 513751 ||  || — || October 8, 2012 || Haleakala || Pan-STARRS ||  || align=right | 1.4 km || 
|-id=752 bgcolor=#E9E9E9
| 513752 ||  || — || September 15, 2012 || Kitt Peak || Spacewatch ||  || align=right | 1.1 km || 
|-id=753 bgcolor=#E9E9E9
| 513753 ||  || — || February 3, 2009 || Mount Lemmon || Mount Lemmon Survey ||  || align=right | 1.5 km || 
|-id=754 bgcolor=#E9E9E9
| 513754 ||  || — || October 21, 2012 || Haleakala || Pan-STARRS ||  || align=right | 1.2 km || 
|-id=755 bgcolor=#E9E9E9
| 513755 ||  || — || November 14, 2012 || Kitt Peak || Spacewatch ||  || align=right | 2.0 km || 
|-id=756 bgcolor=#E9E9E9
| 513756 ||  || — || December 22, 2008 || Mount Lemmon || Mount Lemmon Survey ||  || align=right | 1.8 km || 
|-id=757 bgcolor=#E9E9E9
| 513757 ||  || — || November 14, 2012 || Kitt Peak || Spacewatch ||  || align=right | 1.8 km || 
|-id=758 bgcolor=#E9E9E9
| 513758 ||  || — || October 21, 2012 || Kitt Peak || Spacewatch ||  || align=right | 1.4 km || 
|-id=759 bgcolor=#E9E9E9
| 513759 ||  || — || October 21, 2012 || Haleakala || Pan-STARRS ||  || align=right | 1.6 km || 
|-id=760 bgcolor=#E9E9E9
| 513760 ||  || — || December 21, 2008 || Catalina || CSS || BAR || align=right | 1.2 km || 
|-id=761 bgcolor=#d6d6d6
| 513761 ||  || — || November 12, 2007 || Mount Lemmon || Mount Lemmon Survey ||  || align=right | 2.9 km || 
|-id=762 bgcolor=#E9E9E9
| 513762 ||  || — || December 20, 2008 || La Sagra || OAM Obs. ||  || align=right | 1.3 km || 
|-id=763 bgcolor=#E9E9E9
| 513763 ||  || — || November 7, 2012 || Kitt Peak || Spacewatch ||  || align=right | 1.3 km || 
|-id=764 bgcolor=#E9E9E9
| 513764 ||  || — || November 7, 2012 || Mount Lemmon || Mount Lemmon Survey ||  || align=right | 1.5 km || 
|-id=765 bgcolor=#E9E9E9
| 513765 ||  || — || April 13, 2010 || Mount Lemmon || Mount Lemmon Survey ||  || align=right | 1.4 km || 
|-id=766 bgcolor=#E9E9E9
| 513766 ||  || — || July 31, 2011 || Haleakala || Pan-STARRS ||  || align=right | 1.3 km || 
|-id=767 bgcolor=#E9E9E9
| 513767 ||  || — || September 9, 2007 || Kitt Peak || Spacewatch ||  || align=right | 1.6 km || 
|-id=768 bgcolor=#E9E9E9
| 513768 ||  || — || September 9, 2007 || Kitt Peak || Spacewatch ||  || align=right | 1.5 km || 
|-id=769 bgcolor=#E9E9E9
| 513769 ||  || — || September 11, 2007 || Mount Lemmon || Mount Lemmon Survey || MRX || align=right data-sort-value="0.93" | 930 m || 
|-id=770 bgcolor=#E9E9E9
| 513770 ||  || — || December 30, 2008 || Mount Lemmon || Mount Lemmon Survey || EUN || align=right data-sort-value="0.99" | 990 m || 
|-id=771 bgcolor=#E9E9E9
| 513771 ||  || — || November 26, 2012 || Mount Lemmon || Mount Lemmon Survey ||  || align=right | 2.0 km || 
|-id=772 bgcolor=#E9E9E9
| 513772 ||  || — || November 26, 2012 || Mount Lemmon || Mount Lemmon Survey ||  || align=right | 1.5 km || 
|-id=773 bgcolor=#E9E9E9
| 513773 ||  || — || December 20, 2012 || Catalina || CSS ||  || align=right | 2.1 km || 
|-id=774 bgcolor=#E9E9E9
| 513774 ||  || — || November 4, 2007 || Kitt Peak || Spacewatch ||  || align=right | 2.0 km || 
|-id=775 bgcolor=#E9E9E9
| 513775 ||  || — || December 23, 2012 || Haleakala || Pan-STARRS ||  || align=right | 1.8 km || 
|-id=776 bgcolor=#FFC2E0
| 513776 ||  || — || August 23, 2007 || Kitt Peak || Spacewatch || AMO +1kmcritical || align=right data-sort-value="0.81" | 810 m || 
|-id=777 bgcolor=#E9E9E9
| 513777 ||  || — || January 3, 2013 || Haleakala || Pan-STARRS || HNS || align=right | 1.2 km || 
|-id=778 bgcolor=#E9E9E9
| 513778 ||  || — || December 23, 2012 || Haleakala || Pan-STARRS ||  || align=right | 2.1 km || 
|-id=779 bgcolor=#d6d6d6
| 513779 ||  || — || November 11, 2007 || Mount Lemmon || Mount Lemmon Survey ||  || align=right | 3.0 km || 
|-id=780 bgcolor=#d6d6d6
| 513780 ||  || — || April 17, 2009 || Mount Lemmon || Mount Lemmon Survey ||  || align=right | 1.8 km || 
|-id=781 bgcolor=#E9E9E9
| 513781 ||  || — || September 26, 2011 || Haleakala || Pan-STARRS || NEM || align=right | 2.0 km || 
|-id=782 bgcolor=#E9E9E9
| 513782 ||  || — || August 19, 2006 || Kitt Peak || Spacewatch ||  || align=right | 2.2 km || 
|-id=783 bgcolor=#E9E9E9
| 513783 ||  || — || May 1, 2009 || Mount Lemmon || Mount Lemmon Survey ||  || align=right | 2.4 km || 
|-id=784 bgcolor=#E9E9E9
| 513784 ||  || — || April 22, 2009 || La Sagra || OAM Obs. ||  || align=right | 2.8 km || 
|-id=785 bgcolor=#d6d6d6
| 513785 ||  || — || September 18, 2011 || Mount Lemmon || Mount Lemmon Survey ||  || align=right | 1.8 km || 
|-id=786 bgcolor=#E9E9E9
| 513786 ||  || — || October 20, 2012 || Mount Lemmon || Mount Lemmon Survey ||  || align=right | 1.9 km || 
|-id=787 bgcolor=#d6d6d6
| 513787 ||  || — || February 9, 2008 || Kitt Peak || Spacewatch || EOS || align=right | 1.9 km || 
|-id=788 bgcolor=#FA8072
| 513788 ||  || — || September 27, 2012 || Haleakala || Pan-STARRS || H || align=right data-sort-value="0.70" | 700 m || 
|-id=789 bgcolor=#E9E9E9
| 513789 ||  || — || December 5, 2007 || Kitt Peak || Spacewatch || DOR || align=right | 2.0 km || 
|-id=790 bgcolor=#d6d6d6
| 513790 ||  || — || January 14, 2002 || Kitt Peak || Spacewatch ||  || align=right | 3.4 km || 
|-id=791 bgcolor=#d6d6d6
| 513791 ||  || — || February 29, 2008 || Kitt Peak || Spacewatch ||  || align=right | 2.4 km || 
|-id=792 bgcolor=#d6d6d6
| 513792 ||  || — || November 2, 2010 || Mount Lemmon || Mount Lemmon Survey ||  || align=right | 2.9 km || 
|-id=793 bgcolor=#d6d6d6
| 513793 ||  || — || October 2, 2006 || Mount Lemmon || Mount Lemmon Survey ||  || align=right | 1.6 km || 
|-id=794 bgcolor=#E9E9E9
| 513794 ||  || — || April 18, 2009 || Mount Lemmon || Mount Lemmon Survey ||  || align=right | 1.8 km || 
|-id=795 bgcolor=#d6d6d6
| 513795 ||  || — || December 3, 2007 || Kitt Peak || Spacewatch ||  || align=right | 1.8 km || 
|-id=796 bgcolor=#d6d6d6
| 513796 ||  || — || August 28, 2005 || Kitt Peak || Spacewatch ||  || align=right | 2.9 km || 
|-id=797 bgcolor=#E9E9E9
| 513797 ||  || — || December 31, 2007 || Kitt Peak || Spacewatch ||  || align=right | 2.2 km || 
|-id=798 bgcolor=#E9E9E9
| 513798 ||  || — || January 17, 2013 || Kitt Peak || Spacewatch ||  || align=right | 1.9 km || 
|-id=799 bgcolor=#E9E9E9
| 513799 ||  || — || September 4, 2010 || Mount Lemmon || Mount Lemmon Survey ||  || align=right | 2.2 km || 
|-id=800 bgcolor=#E9E9E9
| 513800 ||  || — || February 9, 2013 || Haleakala || Pan-STARRS || GEF || align=right | 1.4 km || 
|}

513801–513900 

|-bgcolor=#d6d6d6
| 513801 ||  || — || March 6, 2008 || Kitt Peak || Spacewatch ||  || align=right | 2.4 km || 
|-id=802 bgcolor=#d6d6d6
| 513802 ||  || — || February 14, 2013 || Haleakala || Pan-STARRS ||  || align=right | 2.5 km || 
|-id=803 bgcolor=#d6d6d6
| 513803 ||  || — || March 5, 2008 || Kitt Peak || Spacewatch ||  || align=right | 2.0 km || 
|-id=804 bgcolor=#d6d6d6
| 513804 ||  || — || March 10, 2008 || Kitt Peak || Spacewatch ||  || align=right | 1.9 km || 
|-id=805 bgcolor=#d6d6d6
| 513805 ||  || — || March 27, 2008 || Kitt Peak || Spacewatch ||  || align=right | 2.4 km || 
|-id=806 bgcolor=#d6d6d6
| 513806 ||  || — || February 8, 2013 || Kitt Peak || Spacewatch ||  || align=right | 3.7 km || 
|-id=807 bgcolor=#d6d6d6
| 513807 ||  || — || February 7, 2013 || Kitt Peak || Spacewatch || EOS || align=right | 1.8 km || 
|-id=808 bgcolor=#d6d6d6
| 513808 ||  || — || February 6, 2013 || Kitt Peak || Spacewatch ||  || align=right | 2.2 km || 
|-id=809 bgcolor=#d6d6d6
| 513809 ||  || — || October 1, 2005 || Mount Lemmon || Mount Lemmon Survey ||  || align=right | 2.1 km || 
|-id=810 bgcolor=#d6d6d6
| 513810 ||  || — || May 15, 2008 || Mount Lemmon || Mount Lemmon Survey ||  || align=right | 2.9 km || 
|-id=811 bgcolor=#d6d6d6
| 513811 ||  || — || February 14, 2013 || Kitt Peak || Spacewatch ||  || align=right | 2.1 km || 
|-id=812 bgcolor=#d6d6d6
| 513812 ||  || — || September 2, 2011 || Haleakala || Pan-STARRS ||  || align=right | 1.9 km || 
|-id=813 bgcolor=#d6d6d6
| 513813 ||  || — || February 28, 2008 || Kitt Peak || Spacewatch ||  || align=right | 2.2 km || 
|-id=814 bgcolor=#fefefe
| 513814 ||  || — || February 13, 2013 || Haleakala || Pan-STARRS || H || align=right data-sort-value="0.59" | 590 m || 
|-id=815 bgcolor=#d6d6d6
| 513815 ||  || — || February 8, 2013 || Kitt Peak || Spacewatch ||  || align=right | 3.1 km || 
|-id=816 bgcolor=#d6d6d6
| 513816 ||  || — || February 1, 1997 || Kitt Peak || Spacewatch ||  || align=right | 1.9 km || 
|-id=817 bgcolor=#fefefe
| 513817 ||  || — || March 4, 2013 || Haleakala || Pan-STARRS || H || align=right data-sort-value="0.67" | 670 m || 
|-id=818 bgcolor=#d6d6d6
| 513818 ||  || — || March 1, 2008 || Kitt Peak || Spacewatch ||  || align=right | 2.0 km || 
|-id=819 bgcolor=#d6d6d6
| 513819 ||  || — || May 3, 2008 || Mount Lemmon || Mount Lemmon Survey ||  || align=right | 1.8 km || 
|-id=820 bgcolor=#d6d6d6
| 513820 ||  || — || March 24, 2003 || Kitt Peak || Spacewatch ||  || align=right | 2.2 km || 
|-id=821 bgcolor=#d6d6d6
| 513821 ||  || — || March 3, 2013 || Kitt Peak || Spacewatch ||  || align=right | 3.2 km || 
|-id=822 bgcolor=#d6d6d6
| 513822 ||  || — || March 4, 1997 || Kitt Peak || Spacewatch ||  || align=right | 2.8 km || 
|-id=823 bgcolor=#d6d6d6
| 513823 ||  || — || October 26, 2011 || Haleakala || Pan-STARRS ||  || align=right | 2.2 km || 
|-id=824 bgcolor=#fefefe
| 513824 ||  || — || February 16, 2013 || Catalina || CSS || H || align=right data-sort-value="0.68" | 680 m || 
|-id=825 bgcolor=#d6d6d6
| 513825 ||  || — || April 16, 2008 || Mount Lemmon || Mount Lemmon Survey ||  || align=right | 1.9 km || 
|-id=826 bgcolor=#fefefe
| 513826 ||  || — || August 29, 2006 || Catalina || CSS || H || align=right data-sort-value="0.67" | 670 m || 
|-id=827 bgcolor=#d6d6d6
| 513827 ||  || — || August 4, 2010 || WISE || WISE ||  || align=right | 3.6 km || 
|-id=828 bgcolor=#d6d6d6
| 513828 ||  || — || October 1, 2011 || Mount Lemmon || Mount Lemmon Survey ||  || align=right | 1.9 km || 
|-id=829 bgcolor=#d6d6d6
| 513829 ||  || — || May 6, 2008 || Kitt Peak || Spacewatch ||  || align=right | 2.4 km || 
|-id=830 bgcolor=#FA8072
| 513830 ||  || — || August 24, 2011 || Haleakala || Pan-STARRS || H || align=right data-sort-value="0.54" | 540 m || 
|-id=831 bgcolor=#d6d6d6
| 513831 ||  || — || March 28, 2008 || Mount Lemmon || Mount Lemmon Survey ||  || align=right | 2.1 km || 
|-id=832 bgcolor=#d6d6d6
| 513832 ||  || — || January 17, 2007 || Kitt Peak || Spacewatch ||  || align=right | 2.4 km || 
|-id=833 bgcolor=#d6d6d6
| 513833 ||  || — || April 15, 2008 || Mount Lemmon || Mount Lemmon Survey ||  || align=right | 2.7 km || 
|-id=834 bgcolor=#fefefe
| 513834 ||  || — || March 8, 2013 || Haleakala || Pan-STARRS || H || align=right data-sort-value="0.49" | 490 m || 
|-id=835 bgcolor=#FA8072
| 513835 ||  || — || September 16, 1998 || Anderson Mesa || LONEOS || H || align=right data-sort-value="0.57" | 570 m || 
|-id=836 bgcolor=#d6d6d6
| 513836 ||  || — || March 5, 2013 || Mount Lemmon || Mount Lemmon Survey ||  || align=right | 2.8 km || 
|-id=837 bgcolor=#d6d6d6
| 513837 ||  || — || April 3, 2008 || Kitt Peak || Spacewatch ||  || align=right | 2.7 km || 
|-id=838 bgcolor=#d6d6d6
| 513838 ||  || — || March 18, 2013 || Kitt Peak || Spacewatch ||  || align=right | 2.2 km || 
|-id=839 bgcolor=#d6d6d6
| 513839 ||  || — || March 13, 2013 || Mount Lemmon || Mount Lemmon Survey ||  || align=right | 2.9 km || 
|-id=840 bgcolor=#d6d6d6
| 513840 ||  || — || April 14, 2008 || Mount Lemmon || Mount Lemmon Survey ||  || align=right | 1.6 km || 
|-id=841 bgcolor=#d6d6d6
| 513841 ||  || — || January 10, 2007 || Mount Lemmon || Mount Lemmon Survey ||  || align=right | 2.3 km || 
|-id=842 bgcolor=#d6d6d6
| 513842 ||  || — || May 6, 2008 || Kitt Peak || Spacewatch ||  || align=right | 1.9 km || 
|-id=843 bgcolor=#fefefe
| 513843 ||  || — || March 16, 2013 || Catalina || CSS || H || align=right data-sort-value="0.71" | 710 m || 
|-id=844 bgcolor=#d6d6d6
| 513844 ||  || — || April 10, 2013 || Haleakala || Pan-STARRS ||  || align=right | 2.8 km || 
|-id=845 bgcolor=#d6d6d6
| 513845 ||  || — || March 13, 2013 || Kitt Peak || Spacewatch ||  || align=right | 2.3 km || 
|-id=846 bgcolor=#d6d6d6
| 513846 ||  || — || April 8, 2008 || Kitt Peak || Spacewatch ||  || align=right | 2.2 km || 
|-id=847 bgcolor=#d6d6d6
| 513847 ||  || — || March 31, 2008 || Mount Lemmon || Mount Lemmon Survey ||  || align=right | 2.6 km || 
|-id=848 bgcolor=#d6d6d6
| 513848 ||  || — || October 23, 2004 || Kitt Peak || Spacewatch ||  || align=right | 3.5 km || 
|-id=849 bgcolor=#fefefe
| 513849 ||  || — || August 25, 2011 || Siding Spring || SSS || H || align=right data-sort-value="0.51" | 510 m || 
|-id=850 bgcolor=#fefefe
| 513850 ||  || — || February 23, 2013 || Catalina || CSS || H || align=right data-sort-value="0.62" | 620 m || 
|-id=851 bgcolor=#fefefe
| 513851 ||  || — || April 2, 2005 || Catalina || CSS || H || align=right data-sort-value="0.69" | 690 m || 
|-id=852 bgcolor=#d6d6d6
| 513852 ||  || — || March 7, 2013 || Kitt Peak || Spacewatch ||  || align=right | 2.3 km || 
|-id=853 bgcolor=#d6d6d6
| 513853 ||  || — || March 16, 2002 || Kitt Peak || Spacewatch ||  || align=right | 2.7 km || 
|-id=854 bgcolor=#d6d6d6
| 513854 ||  || — || October 28, 2005 || Mount Lemmon || Mount Lemmon Survey ||  || align=right | 2.5 km || 
|-id=855 bgcolor=#d6d6d6
| 513855 ||  || — || April 11, 2013 || Mount Lemmon || Mount Lemmon Survey ||  || align=right | 3.2 km || 
|-id=856 bgcolor=#d6d6d6
| 513856 ||  || — || February 23, 2007 || Kitt Peak || Spacewatch ||  || align=right | 2.7 km || 
|-id=857 bgcolor=#d6d6d6
| 513857 ||  || — || December 23, 2012 || Haleakala || Pan-STARRS || EOS || align=right | 1.9 km || 
|-id=858 bgcolor=#d6d6d6
| 513858 ||  || — || January 10, 2007 || Mount Lemmon || Mount Lemmon Survey ||  || align=right | 2.4 km || 
|-id=859 bgcolor=#d6d6d6
| 513859 ||  || — || October 31, 2010 || Mount Lemmon || Mount Lemmon Survey || HYG || align=right | 2.4 km || 
|-id=860 bgcolor=#fefefe
| 513860 ||  || — || December 1, 2003 || Kitt Peak || Spacewatch || H || align=right data-sort-value="0.65" | 650 m || 
|-id=861 bgcolor=#fefefe
| 513861 ||  || — || June 11, 2011 || Haleakala || Pan-STARRS || H || align=right data-sort-value="0.75" | 750 m || 
|-id=862 bgcolor=#d6d6d6
| 513862 ||  || — || March 14, 2013 || Kitt Peak || Spacewatch ||  || align=right | 2.5 km || 
|-id=863 bgcolor=#d6d6d6
| 513863 ||  || — || March 16, 2007 || Mount Lemmon || Mount Lemmon Survey ||  || align=right | 2.2 km || 
|-id=864 bgcolor=#d6d6d6
| 513864 ||  || — || December 4, 2005 || Kitt Peak || Spacewatch ||  || align=right | 2.3 km || 
|-id=865 bgcolor=#d6d6d6
| 513865 ||  || — || October 29, 2010 || Mount Lemmon || Mount Lemmon Survey || EOS || align=right | 1.4 km || 
|-id=866 bgcolor=#d6d6d6
| 513866 ||  || — || October 27, 2005 || Kitt Peak || Spacewatch ||  || align=right | 2.3 km || 
|-id=867 bgcolor=#d6d6d6
| 513867 ||  || — || March 10, 2007 || Mount Lemmon || Mount Lemmon Survey ||  || align=right | 2.0 km || 
|-id=868 bgcolor=#fefefe
| 513868 ||  || — || December 19, 2009 || Mount Lemmon || Mount Lemmon Survey || H || align=right data-sort-value="0.83" | 830 m || 
|-id=869 bgcolor=#d6d6d6
| 513869 ||  || — || April 11, 2013 || Catalina || CSS || Tj (2.99) || align=right | 4.5 km || 
|-id=870 bgcolor=#d6d6d6
| 513870 ||  || — || January 20, 2012 || Haleakala || Pan-STARRS ||  || align=right | 3.6 km || 
|-id=871 bgcolor=#fefefe
| 513871 ||  || — || April 20, 2013 || Haleakala || Pan-STARRS || H || align=right data-sort-value="0.59" | 590 m || 
|-id=872 bgcolor=#d6d6d6
| 513872 ||  || — || February 13, 2012 || Haleakala || Pan-STARRS ||  || align=right | 2.9 km || 
|-id=873 bgcolor=#d6d6d6
| 513873 ||  || — || February 23, 2007 || Mount Lemmon || Mount Lemmon Survey ||  || align=right | 2.0 km || 
|-id=874 bgcolor=#d6d6d6
| 513874 ||  || — || March 11, 2007 || Kitt Peak || Spacewatch ||  || align=right | 3.1 km || 
|-id=875 bgcolor=#d6d6d6
| 513875 ||  || — || April 15, 2013 || Haleakala || Pan-STARRS ||  || align=right | 3.3 km || 
|-id=876 bgcolor=#fefefe
| 513876 ||  || — || May 31, 2013 || Haleakala || Pan-STARRS || H || align=right data-sort-value="0.67" | 670 m || 
|-id=877 bgcolor=#d6d6d6
| 513877 ||  || — || January 2, 2012 || Mount Lemmon || Mount Lemmon Survey ||  || align=right | 2.9 km || 
|-id=878 bgcolor=#d6d6d6
| 513878 ||  || — || May 15, 2013 || Haleakala || Pan-STARRS ||  || align=right | 3.2 km || 
|-id=879 bgcolor=#d6d6d6
| 513879 ||  || — || January 27, 2012 || Mount Lemmon || Mount Lemmon Survey ||  || align=right | 2.6 km || 
|-id=880 bgcolor=#d6d6d6
| 513880 ||  || — || June 1, 2013 || Haleakala || Pan-STARRS || Tj (2.93) || align=right | 4.1 km || 
|-id=881 bgcolor=#fefefe
| 513881 ||  || — || December 13, 2006 || Kitt Peak || Spacewatch || H || align=right data-sort-value="0.61" | 610 m || 
|-id=882 bgcolor=#d6d6d6
| 513882 ||  || — || January 26, 2012 || Haleakala || Pan-STARRS ||  || align=right | 2.5 km || 
|-id=883 bgcolor=#fefefe
| 513883 ||  || — || February 28, 2008 || Catalina || CSS ||  || align=right data-sort-value="0.78" | 780 m || 
|-id=884 bgcolor=#fefefe
| 513884 ||  || — || June 30, 2013 || Haleakala || Pan-STARRS ||  || align=right data-sort-value="0.70" | 700 m || 
|-id=885 bgcolor=#fefefe
| 513885 ||  || — || October 11, 2010 || Mount Lemmon || Mount Lemmon Survey ||  || align=right data-sort-value="0.46" | 460 m || 
|-id=886 bgcolor=#fefefe
| 513886 ||  || — || January 14, 2008 || Kitt Peak || Spacewatch ||  || align=right data-sort-value="0.62" | 620 m || 
|-id=887 bgcolor=#fefefe
| 513887 ||  || — || September 25, 2013 || Mount Lemmon || Mount Lemmon Survey ||  || align=right data-sort-value="0.81" | 810 m || 
|-id=888 bgcolor=#E9E9E9
| 513888 ||  || — || May 26, 2007 || Mount Lemmon || Mount Lemmon Survey ||  || align=right | 1.8 km || 
|-id=889 bgcolor=#fefefe
| 513889 ||  || — || September 16, 2006 || Siding Spring || SSS ||  || align=right | 1.2 km || 
|-id=890 bgcolor=#fefefe
| 513890 ||  || — || November 28, 1999 || Kitt Peak || Spacewatch ||  || align=right data-sort-value="0.52" | 520 m || 
|-id=891 bgcolor=#C2FFFF
| 513891 ||  || — || August 24, 2012 || Kitt Peak || Spacewatch || L5 || align=right | 8.5 km || 
|-id=892 bgcolor=#fefefe
| 513892 ||  || — || August 28, 2006 || Catalina || CSS ||  || align=right data-sort-value="0.58" | 580 m || 
|-id=893 bgcolor=#fefefe
| 513893 ||  || — || January 13, 2008 || Kitt Peak || Spacewatch ||  || align=right data-sort-value="0.64" | 640 m || 
|-id=894 bgcolor=#fefefe
| 513894 ||  || — || September 14, 2013 || Mount Lemmon || Mount Lemmon Survey ||  || align=right data-sort-value="0.83" | 830 m || 
|-id=895 bgcolor=#fefefe
| 513895 ||  || — || August 14, 2006 || Siding Spring || SSS ||  || align=right data-sort-value="0.76" | 760 m || 
|-id=896 bgcolor=#fefefe
| 513896 ||  || — || September 18, 2006 || Catalina || CSS ||  || align=right data-sort-value="0.69" | 690 m || 
|-id=897 bgcolor=#fefefe
| 513897 ||  || — || April 26, 2008 || Mount Lemmon || Mount Lemmon Survey ||  || align=right data-sort-value="0.73" | 730 m || 
|-id=898 bgcolor=#E9E9E9
| 513898 ||  || — || September 22, 2012 || Mount Lemmon || Mount Lemmon Survey ||  || align=right | 1.7 km || 
|-id=899 bgcolor=#fefefe
| 513899 ||  || — || September 20, 1995 || Kitt Peak || Spacewatch ||  || align=right data-sort-value="0.61" | 610 m || 
|-id=900 bgcolor=#fefefe
| 513900 ||  || — || December 9, 2006 || Kitt Peak || Spacewatch ||  || align=right data-sort-value="0.62" | 620 m || 
|}

513901–514000 

|-bgcolor=#E9E9E9
| 513901 ||  || — || March 14, 2010 || Kitt Peak || Spacewatch ||  || align=right | 1.6 km || 
|-id=902 bgcolor=#fefefe
| 513902 ||  || — || December 23, 2013 || Mount Lemmon || Mount Lemmon Survey ||  || align=right data-sort-value="0.79" | 790 m || 
|-id=903 bgcolor=#E9E9E9
| 513903 ||  || — || December 23, 2013 || Mount Lemmon || Mount Lemmon Survey ||  || align=right | 1.2 km || 
|-id=904 bgcolor=#fefefe
| 513904 ||  || — || July 28, 2009 || Kitt Peak || Spacewatch ||  || align=right data-sort-value="0.89" | 890 m || 
|-id=905 bgcolor=#fefefe
| 513905 ||  || — || October 27, 2005 || Kitt Peak || Spacewatch ||  || align=right data-sort-value="0.65" | 650 m || 
|-id=906 bgcolor=#fefefe
| 513906 ||  || — || January 10, 2007 || Mount Lemmon || Mount Lemmon Survey ||  || align=right data-sort-value="0.71" | 710 m || 
|-id=907 bgcolor=#fefefe
| 513907 ||  || — || November 5, 2005 || Catalina || CSS ||  || align=right data-sort-value="0.92" | 920 m || 
|-id=908 bgcolor=#fefefe
| 513908 ||  || — || December 1, 1994 || Kitt Peak || Spacewatch ||  || align=right data-sort-value="0.75" | 750 m || 
|-id=909 bgcolor=#fefefe
| 513909 ||  || — || October 25, 2005 || Kitt Peak || Spacewatch ||  || align=right data-sort-value="0.68" | 680 m || 
|-id=910 bgcolor=#fefefe
| 513910 ||  || — || March 11, 2007 || Kitt Peak || Spacewatch ||  || align=right data-sort-value="0.71" | 710 m || 
|-id=911 bgcolor=#fefefe
| 513911 ||  || — || April 9, 1999 || Kitt Peak || Spacewatch || MAS || align=right data-sort-value="0.66" | 660 m || 
|-id=912 bgcolor=#fefefe
| 513912 ||  || — || March 23, 2003 || Kitt Peak || Spacewatch ||  || align=right data-sort-value="0.69" | 690 m || 
|-id=913 bgcolor=#fefefe
| 513913 ||  || — || September 16, 2009 || Kitt Peak || Spacewatch ||  || align=right data-sort-value="0.68" | 680 m || 
|-id=914 bgcolor=#fefefe
| 513914 ||  || — || March 28, 2010 || WISE || WISE ||  || align=right | 1.8 km || 
|-id=915 bgcolor=#fefefe
| 513915 ||  || — || January 24, 2007 || Mount Lemmon || Mount Lemmon Survey || NYS || align=right data-sort-value="0.55" | 550 m || 
|-id=916 bgcolor=#FFC2E0
| 513916 ||  || — || December 11, 2013 || Mount Lemmon || Mount Lemmon Survey || AMOcritical || align=right data-sort-value="0.51" | 510 m || 
|-id=917 bgcolor=#fefefe
| 513917 ||  || — || November 9, 2013 || Mount Lemmon || Mount Lemmon Survey ||  || align=right data-sort-value="0.80" | 800 m || 
|-id=918 bgcolor=#fefefe
| 513918 ||  || — || April 11, 2011 || Mount Lemmon || Mount Lemmon Survey ||  || align=right data-sort-value="0.90" | 900 m || 
|-id=919 bgcolor=#E9E9E9
| 513919 ||  || — || September 11, 2004 || Kitt Peak || Spacewatch ||  || align=right data-sort-value="0.81" | 810 m || 
|-id=920 bgcolor=#fefefe
| 513920 ||  || — || October 1, 2005 || Mount Lemmon || Mount Lemmon Survey || NYS || align=right data-sort-value="0.59" | 590 m || 
|-id=921 bgcolor=#fefefe
| 513921 ||  || — || January 21, 2014 || Kitt Peak || Spacewatch ||  || align=right data-sort-value="0.65" | 650 m || 
|-id=922 bgcolor=#fefefe
| 513922 ||  || — || January 25, 2014 || Haleakala || Pan-STARRS ||  || align=right | 1.1 km || 
|-id=923 bgcolor=#fefefe
| 513923 ||  || — || January 1, 2014 || Mount Lemmon || Mount Lemmon Survey ||  || align=right data-sort-value="0.93" | 930 m || 
|-id=924 bgcolor=#E9E9E9
| 513924 ||  || — || January 16, 2010 || Mount Lemmon || Mount Lemmon Survey ||  || align=right | 1.2 km || 
|-id=925 bgcolor=#fefefe
| 513925 ||  || — || November 30, 2005 || Kitt Peak || Spacewatch ||  || align=right data-sort-value="0.90" | 900 m || 
|-id=926 bgcolor=#E9E9E9
| 513926 ||  || — || January 1, 2014 || Mount Lemmon || Mount Lemmon Survey ||  || align=right data-sort-value="0.85" | 850 m || 
|-id=927 bgcolor=#E9E9E9
| 513927 ||  || — || January 9, 2014 || Mount Lemmon || Mount Lemmon Survey || JUN || align=right data-sort-value="0.99" | 990 m || 
|-id=928 bgcolor=#E9E9E9
| 513928 ||  || — || November 6, 2008 || Mount Lemmon || Mount Lemmon Survey ||  || align=right | 1.2 km || 
|-id=929 bgcolor=#E9E9E9
| 513929 ||  || — || April 8, 2010 || XuYi || PMO NEO ||  || align=right data-sort-value="0.75" | 750 m || 
|-id=930 bgcolor=#E9E9E9
| 513930 ||  || — || September 4, 2011 || Haleakala || Pan-STARRS ||  || align=right | 1.5 km || 
|-id=931 bgcolor=#fefefe
| 513931 ||  || — || August 26, 2012 || Haleakala || Pan-STARRS ||  || align=right data-sort-value="0.90" | 900 m || 
|-id=932 bgcolor=#E9E9E9
| 513932 ||  || — || February 26, 2014 || Mount Lemmon || Mount Lemmon Survey ||  || align=right data-sort-value="0.87" | 870 m || 
|-id=933 bgcolor=#E9E9E9
| 513933 ||  || — || February 26, 2014 || Haleakala || Pan-STARRS ||  || align=right data-sort-value="0.94" | 940 m || 
|-id=934 bgcolor=#E9E9E9
| 513934 ||  || — || September 22, 2012 || Kitt Peak || Spacewatch ||  || align=right data-sort-value="0.85" | 850 m || 
|-id=935 bgcolor=#E9E9E9
| 513935 ||  || — || November 17, 2012 || Mount Lemmon || Mount Lemmon Survey ||  || align=right | 1.3 km || 
|-id=936 bgcolor=#E9E9E9
| 513936 ||  || — || August 2, 2011 || Haleakala || Pan-STARRS || HNS || align=right data-sort-value="0.86" | 860 m || 
|-id=937 bgcolor=#E9E9E9
| 513937 ||  || — || October 17, 2012 || Mount Lemmon || Mount Lemmon Survey ||  || align=right data-sort-value="0.82" | 820 m || 
|-id=938 bgcolor=#E9E9E9
| 513938 ||  || — || February 26, 2014 || Haleakala || Pan-STARRS ||  || align=right | 1.4 km || 
|-id=939 bgcolor=#E9E9E9
| 513939 ||  || — || October 8, 2012 || Haleakala || Pan-STARRS ||  || align=right data-sort-value="0.97" | 970 m || 
|-id=940 bgcolor=#E9E9E9
| 513940 ||  || — || October 20, 2012 || Haleakala || Pan-STARRS || MAR || align=right data-sort-value="0.98" | 980 m || 
|-id=941 bgcolor=#E9E9E9
| 513941 ||  || — || September 3, 2008 || Kitt Peak || Spacewatch ||  || align=right data-sort-value="0.74" | 740 m || 
|-id=942 bgcolor=#E9E9E9
| 513942 ||  || — || April 15, 2010 || Kitt Peak || Spacewatch ||  || align=right data-sort-value="0.97" | 970 m || 
|-id=943 bgcolor=#E9E9E9
| 513943 ||  || — || September 9, 2008 || Mount Lemmon || Mount Lemmon Survey ||  || align=right data-sort-value="0.71" | 710 m || 
|-id=944 bgcolor=#E9E9E9
| 513944 ||  || — || February 15, 2010 || Kitt Peak || Spacewatch ||  || align=right data-sort-value="0.79" | 790 m || 
|-id=945 bgcolor=#E9E9E9
| 513945 ||  || — || February 27, 2014 || Kitt Peak || Spacewatch ||  || align=right | 1.5 km || 
|-id=946 bgcolor=#E9E9E9
| 513946 ||  || — || November 1, 2008 || Mount Lemmon || Mount Lemmon Survey ||  || align=right | 1.2 km || 
|-id=947 bgcolor=#E9E9E9
| 513947 ||  || — || September 26, 2011 || Mount Lemmon || Mount Lemmon Survey || ADE || align=right | 1.8 km || 
|-id=948 bgcolor=#E9E9E9
| 513948 ||  || — || October 20, 2012 || Haleakala || Pan-STARRS ||  || align=right data-sort-value="0.78" | 780 m || 
|-id=949 bgcolor=#E9E9E9
| 513949 ||  || — || March 18, 2010 || Mount Lemmon || Mount Lemmon Survey || EUN || align=right data-sort-value="0.88" | 880 m || 
|-id=950 bgcolor=#E9E9E9
| 513950 ||  || — || May 5, 2010 || Mount Lemmon || Mount Lemmon Survey ||  || align=right | 2.2 km || 
|-id=951 bgcolor=#d6d6d6
| 513951 ||  || — || February 26, 2014 || Haleakala || Pan-STARRS ||  || align=right | 2.7 km || 
|-id=952 bgcolor=#E9E9E9
| 513952 ||  || — || January 13, 2010 || WISE || WISE ||  || align=right | 2.7 km || 
|-id=953 bgcolor=#E9E9E9
| 513953 ||  || — || December 3, 2012 || Mount Lemmon || Mount Lemmon Survey ||  || align=right | 1.3 km || 
|-id=954 bgcolor=#E9E9E9
| 513954 ||  || — || October 10, 2007 || Mount Lemmon || Mount Lemmon Survey ||  || align=right | 1.8 km || 
|-id=955 bgcolor=#E9E9E9
| 513955 ||  || — || January 12, 2010 || WISE || WISE ||  || align=right | 1.4 km || 
|-id=956 bgcolor=#E9E9E9
| 513956 ||  || — || March 15, 2010 || Kitt Peak || Spacewatch ||  || align=right data-sort-value="0.82" | 820 m || 
|-id=957 bgcolor=#E9E9E9
| 513957 ||  || — || July 26, 2011 || Haleakala || Pan-STARRS ||  || align=right | 1.0 km || 
|-id=958 bgcolor=#E9E9E9
| 513958 ||  || — || October 10, 2012 || Mount Lemmon || Mount Lemmon Survey ||  || align=right | 2.2 km || 
|-id=959 bgcolor=#E9E9E9
| 513959 ||  || — || September 13, 2004 || Kitt Peak || Spacewatch ||  || align=right data-sort-value="0.90" | 900 m || 
|-id=960 bgcolor=#d6d6d6
| 513960 ||  || — || October 2, 2006 || Mount Lemmon || Mount Lemmon Survey ||  || align=right | 2.9 km || 
|-id=961 bgcolor=#E9E9E9
| 513961 ||  || — || September 5, 2008 || Kitt Peak || Spacewatch ||  || align=right data-sort-value="0.74" | 740 m || 
|-id=962 bgcolor=#E9E9E9
| 513962 ||  || — || September 22, 2012 || Mount Lemmon || Mount Lemmon Survey ||  || align=right | 1.3 km || 
|-id=963 bgcolor=#E9E9E9
| 513963 ||  || — || September 13, 2007 || Mount Lemmon || Mount Lemmon Survey ||  || align=right | 1.3 km || 
|-id=964 bgcolor=#fefefe
| 513964 ||  || — || January 26, 2014 || Haleakala || Pan-STARRS ||  || align=right data-sort-value="0.76" | 760 m || 
|-id=965 bgcolor=#E9E9E9
| 513965 ||  || — || October 26, 2012 || Haleakala || Pan-STARRS ||  || align=right | 3.3 km || 
|-id=966 bgcolor=#E9E9E9
| 513966 ||  || — || February 26, 2014 || Kitt Peak || Spacewatch ||  || align=right | 1.9 km || 
|-id=967 bgcolor=#E9E9E9
| 513967 ||  || — || August 10, 2007 || Kitt Peak || Spacewatch ||  || align=right | 1.6 km || 
|-id=968 bgcolor=#E9E9E9
| 513968 ||  || — || February 26, 2014 || Mount Lemmon || Mount Lemmon Survey ||  || align=right data-sort-value="0.92" | 920 m || 
|-id=969 bgcolor=#E9E9E9
| 513969 ||  || — || February 25, 2014 || Haleakala || Pan-STARRS ||  || align=right | 1.6 km || 
|-id=970 bgcolor=#E9E9E9
| 513970 ||  || — || December 2, 2008 || Kitt Peak || Spacewatch ||  || align=right data-sort-value="0.99" | 990 m || 
|-id=971 bgcolor=#E9E9E9
| 513971 ||  || — || October 18, 2011 || Mount Lemmon || Mount Lemmon Survey ||  || align=right | 1.5 km || 
|-id=972 bgcolor=#E9E9E9
| 513972 ||  || — || February 26, 2014 || Haleakala || Pan-STARRS ||  || align=right | 1.0 km || 
|-id=973 bgcolor=#E9E9E9
| 513973 ||  || — || November 3, 2008 || Mount Lemmon || Mount Lemmon Survey ||  || align=right data-sort-value="0.88" | 880 m || 
|-id=974 bgcolor=#E9E9E9
| 513974 ||  || — || March 10, 2005 || Mount Lemmon || Mount Lemmon Survey ||  || align=right | 1.6 km || 
|-id=975 bgcolor=#E9E9E9
| 513975 ||  || — || April 1, 2014 || Mount Lemmon || Mount Lemmon Survey ||  || align=right | 1.2 km || 
|-id=976 bgcolor=#E9E9E9
| 513976 ||  || — || March 12, 2005 || Kitt Peak || Spacewatch ||  || align=right | 1.1 km || 
|-id=977 bgcolor=#E9E9E9
| 513977 ||  || — || February 28, 2014 || Haleakala || Pan-STARRS ||  || align=right | 1.0 km || 
|-id=978 bgcolor=#E9E9E9
| 513978 ||  || — || February 9, 2014 || Mount Lemmon || Mount Lemmon Survey ||  || align=right | 2.3 km || 
|-id=979 bgcolor=#E9E9E9
| 513979 ||  || — || February 21, 2009 || Kitt Peak || Spacewatch ||  || align=right | 1.5 km || 
|-id=980 bgcolor=#E9E9E9
| 513980 ||  || — || May 5, 2010 || Catalina || CSS ||  || align=right | 1.1 km || 
|-id=981 bgcolor=#E9E9E9
| 513981 ||  || — || April 9, 2010 || Mount Lemmon || Mount Lemmon Survey ||  || align=right | 1.2 km || 
|-id=982 bgcolor=#d6d6d6
| 513982 ||  || — || February 6, 2013 || Kitt Peak || Spacewatch ||  || align=right | 3.1 km || 
|-id=983 bgcolor=#E9E9E9
| 513983 ||  || — || November 19, 2007 || Mount Lemmon || Mount Lemmon Survey ||  || align=right | 2.0 km || 
|-id=984 bgcolor=#E9E9E9
| 513984 ||  || — || April 5, 2014 || Haleakala || Pan-STARRS ||  || align=right | 2.0 km || 
|-id=985 bgcolor=#E9E9E9
| 513985 ||  || — || November 1, 2007 || Mount Lemmon || Mount Lemmon Survey ||  || align=right | 1.7 km || 
|-id=986 bgcolor=#E9E9E9
| 513986 ||  || — || February 19, 2009 || Kitt Peak || Spacewatch ||  || align=right | 1.9 km || 
|-id=987 bgcolor=#E9E9E9
| 513987 ||  || — || February 28, 2014 || Haleakala || Pan-STARRS ||  || align=right | 1.8 km || 
|-id=988 bgcolor=#E9E9E9
| 513988 ||  || — || October 18, 2012 || Haleakala || Pan-STARRS ||  || align=right | 1.1 km || 
|-id=989 bgcolor=#E9E9E9
| 513989 ||  || — || March 25, 2014 || Kitt Peak || Spacewatch ||  || align=right | 1.8 km || 
|-id=990 bgcolor=#E9E9E9
| 513990 ||  || — || April 5, 2014 || Haleakala || Pan-STARRS ||  || align=right | 1.6 km || 
|-id=991 bgcolor=#E9E9E9
| 513991 ||  || — || October 22, 2012 || Haleakala || Pan-STARRS ||  || align=right | 1.2 km || 
|-id=992 bgcolor=#E9E9E9
| 513992 ||  || — || April 6, 2005 || Kitt Peak || Spacewatch ||  || align=right | 1.9 km || 
|-id=993 bgcolor=#E9E9E9
| 513993 ||  || — || January 31, 2009 || Mount Lemmon || Mount Lemmon Survey || AEO || align=right data-sort-value="0.98" | 980 m || 
|-id=994 bgcolor=#d6d6d6
| 513994 ||  || — || September 2, 2011 || Haleakala || Pan-STARRS ||  || align=right | 1.8 km || 
|-id=995 bgcolor=#E9E9E9
| 513995 ||  || — || November 3, 2007 || Kitt Peak || Spacewatch ||  || align=right | 1.5 km || 
|-id=996 bgcolor=#d6d6d6
| 513996 ||  || — || April 5, 2014 || Haleakala || Pan-STARRS ||  || align=right | 1.7 km || 
|-id=997 bgcolor=#E9E9E9
| 513997 ||  || — || February 27, 2014 || Kitt Peak || Spacewatch ||  || align=right | 1.3 km || 
|-id=998 bgcolor=#E9E9E9
| 513998 ||  || — || October 9, 2007 || Mount Lemmon || Mount Lemmon Survey || EUN || align=right data-sort-value="0.99" | 990 m || 
|-id=999 bgcolor=#E9E9E9
| 513999 ||  || — || September 23, 2011 || Kitt Peak || Spacewatch ||  || align=right | 1.9 km || 
|-id=000 bgcolor=#d6d6d6
| 514000 ||  || — || October 22, 2006 || Kitt Peak || Spacewatch ||  || align=right | 1.8 km || 
|}

References

External links 
 Discovery Circumstances: Numbered Minor Planets (510001)–(515000) (IAU Minor Planet Center)

0513